= List of large-scale temperature reconstructions of the last 2,000 years =

This list of large-scale temperature reconstructions of the last 2,000 years includes climate reconstructions which have contributed significantly to the modern consensus on the temperature record of the past 2,000 years.

The instrumental temperature record only covers the last 150 years at a hemispheric or global scale, and reconstructions of earlier periods are based on climate proxies. In an early attempt to show that climate had changed, Hubert Lamb's 1965 paper generalised from temperature records of central England together with historical, botanical, and archeological evidence to produce a qualitative estimate of temperatures in the North Atlantic region. Subsequent quantitative reconstructions used statistical techniques with various climate proxies to produce larger-scale reconstructions. Tree ring proxies can give an annual resolution of extratropical regions of the northern hemisphere and can be statistically combined with other sparser proxies to produce multiproxy hemispherical or global reconstructions.

Quantitative reconstructions have consistently shown earlier temperatures below the temperature levels reached in the late 20th century. This pattern as seen in Mann, Bradley & Hughes 1999 was dubbed the hockey stick graph, and as of 2010 this broad conclusion was supported by more than two dozen reconstructions, using various statistical methods and combinations of proxy records, with variations in how flat the pre-20th century "shaft" appears.

== List of reconstructions in order of publication ==
- Huntington 1915 "Civilization and Climate".
- Lamb 1965 "The early medieval warm epoch and its sequel".
- Groveman & Landsberg 1979 "Simulated northern hemisphere temperature departures 1579–1880".
- Jacoby & D'Arrigo 1989 "Reconstructed Northern Hemisphere annual temperature since 1671 based on high-latitude tree-ring data from North America".
- Bradley & Jones 1993 "Little Ice Age summer temperature variations; their nature and relevance to recent global warming trends".
- Hughes & Diaz 1994 "Was there a 'medieval warm period', and if so, where and when?".
- Mann, Park & Bradley 1995 "Global interdecadal and century-scale climate oscillations during the past five centuries".
- Overpeck et al. 1997 "Arctic Environmental Change of the Last Four Centuries".
- Fisher 1997 "High resolution reconstructed Northern Hemisphere temperatures for the last few centuries: using regional average tree ring, ice core and historical annual time series".

=== Cited in IPCC TAR ===
The IPCC Third Assessment Report (TAR WG1) of 2001 cited the following reconstructions supporting its conclusion that the 1990s was likely to have been the warmest Northern Hemisphere decade for 1,000 years:

- Mann, Bradley & Hughes 1998 "Global-scale temperature patterns and climate forcing over the past six centuries"
- Jones et al. 1998 "High-resolution palaeoclimatic records for the last millennium: interpretation, integration and comparison with General Circulation Model control-run temperatures".
- Pollack, Huang & Shen 1998 "Climate change record in subsurface temperatures: A global perspective".
- Mann, Bradley & Hughes 1999 "Northern hemisphere temperatures during the past millennium: Inferences, uncertainties, and limitations".
- Briffa 2000 "Annual climate variability in the Holocene: interpreting the message of ancient trees".
- Crowley & Lowery 2000 "How Warm Was the Medieval Warm Period?".

=== Cited in NRC Report (North Report) ===
North et al. 2006 highlighted six recent reconstructions, one of which was not cited in AR4:

- Huang, Pollack & Shen 2000 "Temperature trends over the past five centuries reconstructed from borehole temperatures"

=== Cited in IPCC AR4 ===
The IPCC Fourth Assessment Report (AR4 WG1) of 2007 cited the following reconstructions in support of its conclusion that the 20th century was likely to have been the warmest in the Northern Hemisphere for at least 1,300 years:

- Jones et al. (1998) [also in TAR], calibrated by Jones, Osborn & Briffa 2001 "The Evolution of Climate Over the Last Millennium".
- Mann, Bradley & Hughes (1999) [also in TAR]
- Briffa (2000) [also in TAR], calibrated by Briffa, Osborn & Schweingruber 2004 "Large-scale temperature inferences from tree rings: a review".
- Crowley & Lowery 2000 "How Warm Was the Medieval Warm Period?" [also in TAR]
- Briffa et al. 2001 "Low-frequency temperature variations from a northern tree ring density network".
- Esper, Cook & Schweingruber 2002 "Low-Frequency Signals in Long Tree-Ring Chronologies for Reconstructing Past Temperature Variability",
  recalibrated by Cook, Esper & D'Arrigo 2004 "Extra-tropical Northern Hemisphere land temperature variability over the past 1000 years".
- Mann & Jones 2003 "Global surface temperatures over the past two millennia."
- Pollack & Smerdon 2004 "Borehole climate reconstructions: Spatial structure and hemispheric averages".
- Oerlemans 2005 "Extracting a climate signal from 169 glacier records".
- Rutherford et al. 2005 "Proxy-based Northern Hemisphere surface temperature reconstructions: Sensitivity to method, predictor network, target season, and target domain".
- Moberg et al. 2005 "Highly variable Northern Hemisphere temperatures reconstructed from low- and high-resolution proxy data".
- D'Arrigo, Wilson & Jacoby 2006 "On the long-term context for late twentieth century warming".
- Osborn & Briffa 2006 "The spatial extent of 20th-century warmth in the context of the past 1200 years".
- Hegerl et al. 2006 "Climate sensitivity constrained by temperature reconstructions over the past seven centuries".

=== Cited in IPCC AR5 ===
The IPCC Fifth Assessment Report (AR5 WG1) of 2013 examined temperature variations during the last two millennia, and cited the following reconstructions in support of its conclusion that for average annual Northern Hemisphere temperatures, "the period 1983–2012 was very likely the warmest 30-year period of the last 800 years (high confidence) and likely the warmest 30-year period of the last 1400 years (medium confidence)":

- Pollack and Smerdon (2004) [also in AR4]
- Moberg et al. (2005) [also in AR4]
- D'Arrigo, Wilson & Jacoby (2006) [also in AR4]
- Frank, Esper & Cook (2007) "Adjustment for proxy number and coherence in a large-scale temperature reconstruction".
- Hegerl et al. (2007) "Detection of human influence on a new, validated 1500–year temperature reconstruction".
- Juckes et al. 2007 "Millennial temperature reconstruction intercomparison and evaluation".
- Loehle & McCulloch (2008) "Correction to: A 2000-year global temperature reconstruction based on non-tree ring proxies".
- Mann et al. 2008 "Proxy-based reconstructions of hemispheric and global surface temperature variations over the past two millennia".
- Mann et al. 2009 "Global Signatures and Dynamical Origins of the Little Ice Age and Medieval Climate Anomaly".
- Ljungqvist 2010 "A New Reconstruction of Temperature Variability in the Extra-Tropical Northern Hemisphere During the Last Two Millennia".
- Christiansen & Ljungqvist 2012 "The extra-tropical Northern Hemisphere temperature in the last two millennia: Reconstructions of low-frequency variability".
- Leclercq & Oerlemans (2012) "Global and Hemispheric temperature reconstruction from glacier length fluctuations".
- Shi et al. 2013 "Northern Hemisphere temperature reconstruction during the last millennium using multiple annual proxies".

=== Further reconstructions ===
- Smith et al. 2006 "Reconstructing hemispheric-scale climates from multiple stalagmite records".
- Lee, Zwiers & Tsao 2008 "Evaluation of proxy-based millennial reconstruction methods".
- Huang, Pollack & Shen 2008 "A late Quaternary climate reconstruction based on borehole heat flux data, borehole temperature data, and the instrumental record"
- Kaufman et al. 2009 "Recent warming reverses long-term arctic cooling".
- Tingley & Huybers 2010a "A Bayesian Algorithm for Reconstructing Climate Anomalies in Space and Time".
- Christiansen & Ljungqvist 2011 "Reconstruction of the Extratropical NH Mean Temperature over the Last Millennium with a Method that Preserves Low-Frequency Variability".
- Ljungqvist et al. 2012 "Northern Hemisphere temperature patterns in the last 12 centuries".
- Marcott et al. 2013 "A Reconstruction of Regional and Global Temperature for the Past 11,300 Years"
- PAGES 2k Consortium 2013 (78 researchers, corresponding author Darrell S. Kaufman) "Continental-scale temperature variability during the past two millennia"
- Raphael Neukom, Nathan Steiger, Juan José Gómez-Navarro, Jianghao Wang & Johannes P. Werner 2019 "No evidence for globally coherent warm and cold periods over the preindustrial Common Era"
- PAGES 2k Consortium 2019 "Consistent multidecadal variability in global temperature reconstructions and simulations over the Common Era"

== References in chronological sequence ==
1915

- Huntington, E. (1915), Civilization and Climate, p. 341

1965

- Lamb, H. (1965), "The early medieval warm epoch and its sequel", Palaeogeography, Palaeoclimatology, Palaeoecology, 1 (D3): 13–37, Bibcode:1965PPP.....1...13L, doi:10.1016/0031-0182(65)90004-0

1979

- Groveman, B. S.; Landsberg, H. E. (1979), "Simulated northern hemisphere temperature departures 1579-1880" (PDF), Geophysical Research Letters, 6 (10): 767, Bibcode:1979GeoRL...6..767G, doi:10.1029/GL006i010p00767

1989

- Jacoby, Gordon C.; D'Arrigo, Roseanne (February 1989), "Reconstructed Northern Hemisphere annual temperature since 1671 based on high-latitude tree-ring data from North America", Climatic Change, 14 (1): 39–59, Bibcode:1989ClCh...14...39J, doi:10.1007/BF00140174, S2CID 153959804

1990

- Folland et al. "Chap. 7: Observed Climate Variation and Change". In IPCC FAR WG1 (1990).
- IPCC FAR WG1 (1990), Houghton, J.T.; Jenkins, G.J.; Ephraums, J.J. (eds.), Climate Change: The IPCC Scientific Assessment (1990), Report prepared for Intergovernmental Panel on Climate Change by Working Group I, Cambridge University Press, ISBN 978-0-521-40360-3 (pb: 0-521-40720-6).

1993

- Bradley, Raymond S.; Jones, Philip D. (December 1993), "'Little Ice Age' summer temperature variations; their nature and relevance to recent global warming trends" (PDF), The Holocene, 3 (4): 367–376, Bibcode:1993Holoc...3..367B, doi:10.1177/095968369300300409, S2CID 131594648

1994

- Hughes, Malcolm K.; Diaz, Henry F. (1 March 1994), "Was there a 'medieval warm period', and if so, where and when?", Climatic Change, 26 (2–3): 109–142, Bibcode:1994ClCh...26..109H, doi:10.1007/BF01092410, S2CID 128680153

1995

- Mann, Michael E.; Park, Jeffrey; Bradley, Raymond S. (16 November 1995), "Global interdecadal and century-scale climate oscillations during the past five centuries", Nature, 378 (6554): 266–270, Bibcode:1995Natur.378..266M, doi:10.1038/378266a0, S2CID 30872107

1996

- Nicholls et al. "Chap. 3: Observed Climate Variability and Change". In IPCC SAR WG1 (1996).
- IPCC SAR WG1 (1996), Houghton, J.T.; Meira Filho, L.G.; Callander, B.A.; Harris, N.; Kattenberg, A.; Maskell, K. (eds.), Climate Change 1995: The Science of Climate Change, Contribution of Working Group I to the Second Assessment Report of the Intergovernmental Panel on Climate Change, Cambridge University Press, ISBN 978-0-521-56433-5 (pb: 0-521-56436-0) pdf Archived 2011-10-15 at the Wayback Machine

1997

- Overpeck, J.; Hughen, K.; Hardy, R.; Bradley, R.; et al. (14 November 1997), "Arctic Environmental Change of the Last Four Centuries", Science, 278 (5341): 1251, Bibcode:1997Sci...278.1251O, doi:10.1126/science.278.5341.1251
- Fisher, D. A. (1997), "High resolution reconstructed Northern Hemisphere temperatures for the last few centuries: using regional average tree ring, ice core and historical annual time series", Paper U32C-7 in Supplement to EOS. Transactions

1998

- Mann, Michael E.; Bradley, Raymond S.; Hughes, Malcolm K. (23 April 1998), "Global-scale temperature patterns and climate forcing over the past six centuries" (PDF), Nature, 392 (6678): 779–787, Bibcode:1998Natur.392..779M, doi:10.1038/33859, S2CID 129871008 Corrigendum: Mann, Bradley & Hughes 2004
- Jones, Phil D.; Briffa, K. R.; Barnett, T. P.; Tett, S. F. B. (May 1998), "High-resolution palaeoclimatic records for the last millennium: interpretation, integration and comparison with General Circulation Model control-run temperatures", The Holocene, 8 (4): 455–471, Bibcode:1998Holoc...8..455J, doi:10.1191/095968398667194956, S2CID 2227769
- Briffa, K. R.; Jones, P. D.; Schweingruber, F. H.; Osborn, T. J. (4 June 1998), "Influence of volcanic eruptions on Northern Hemisphere summer temperature over the past 600 years" (PDF), Nature, 393 (6684): 450, Bibcode:1998Natur.393..450B, doi:10.1038/30943, S2CID 4392636, archived from the original (PDF) on 1 April 2012
- Pollack, Henry N.; Huang, Shaopeng; Shen, Po-Yu (9 October 1998), "Climate change record in subsurface temperatures: A global perspective", Science, 282 (5387): 279–281, Bibcode:1998Sci...282..279P, doi:10.1126/science.282.5387.279, PMID 9765150, S2CID 39954322

1999

- Mann, Michael E.; Bradley, Raymond S.; Hughes, Malcolm K. (1999), "Northern hemisphere temperatures during the past millennium: Inferences, uncertainties, and limitations", Geophysical Research Letters, 26 (6): 759, Bibcode:1999GeoRL..26..759M, doi:10.1029/1999GL900070
- Briffa, Keith R.; Osborn, Timothy J. (7 May 1999), "CLIMATE WARMING: Seeing the Wood from the Trees", Science, 284 (5416): 926–927, Bibcode:1999Sci...284..926., doi:10.1126/science.284.5416.926, S2CID 140683312.

2000

- Briffa, Keith R. (1 January 2000), "Annual climate variability in the Holocene: interpreting the message of ancient trees", Quaternary Science Reviews, 19 (1–5): 87–105, Bibcode:2000QSRv...19...87B, doi:10.1016/S0277-3791(99)00056-6.
- Huang, Shaopeng; Pollack, Henry N.; Shen, Po-Yu (17 February 2000), "Temperature trends over the past five centuries reconstructed from borehole temperatures" (PDF), Nature, 403 (6771): 756–758, Bibcode:2000Natur.403..756H, doi:10.1038/35001556, hdl:2027.42/62610, PMID 10693801, S2CID 4425128
- Crowley, Thomas J.; Lowery, Thomas S. (February 2000), "How Warm Was the Medieval Warm Period?", Ambio: A Journal of the Human Environment, 29 (1): 51–54, doi:10.1579/0044-7447-29.1.51, S2CID 86527510
- Jones, Phil (June 2000), CRU Information Sheet no. 5: The Millennial Temperature Record, University of East Anglia, archived from the original on 2013-12-13

2001

- Briffa, K. R.; Osborn, T. J.; Schweingruber, F. H.; Harris, I. C.; Jones, P. D.; Shiyatov, S. G.; Vaganov, E. A. (16 February 2001), "Low-frequency temperature variations from a northern tree ring density network", Journal of Geophysical Research, 106 (D3): 2929, Bibcode:2001JGR...106.2929B, doi:10.1029/2000JD900617, S2CID 129031846
- Jones, P. D.; Osborn, T. J.; Briffa, K. R. (27 April 2001), "The Evolution of Climate over the Last Millennium", Science, 292 (5517): 662–667, Bibcode:2001Sci...292..662J, doi:10.1126/science.1059126, PMID 11326088, S2CID 37235993
- IPCC WG1 SPM. "Summary for Policymakers". In IPCC TAR WG1 (2001).
- Albritton et al. "Technical Summary". In IPCC TAR WG1 (2001).
- Folland et al. "Chapter 2: Observed Climate Variability and Change". In IPCC TAR WG1 (2001).
- IPCC TAR WG1 (2001), Houghton, J.T.; Ding, Y.; Griggs, D.J.; Noguer, M.; van der Linden, P.J.; Dai, X.; Maskell, K.; Johnson, C.A. (eds.), Climate Change 2001: The Scientific Basis, Contribution of Working Group I to the Third Assessment Report of the Intergovernmental Panel on Climate Change, Cambridge University Press, ISBN 978-0-521-80767-8, archived from the original on 2019-12-15 (pb: 0-521-01495-6)
- IPCC TAR SYR (2001), Watson, R. T.; the Core Writing Team (eds.), Climate Change 2001: Synthesis Report, Contribution of Working Groups I, II, and III to the Third Assessment Report of the Intergovernmental Panel on Climate Change, Cambridge University Press, ISBN 0-521-80770-0, archived from the original on 2018-11-03 (pb: 0-521-01507-3)

2002

- Esper, J.; Cook, E. R.; Schweingruber, F. H. (22 March 2002), "Low-Frequency Signals in Long Tree-Ring Chronologies for Reconstructing Past Temperature Variability", Science, 295 (5563): 2250–2253, Bibcode:2002Sci...295.2250E, doi:10.1126/science.1066208, PMID 11910106, S2CID 22184321

2003

- Mann, Michael E.; Jones, Phil D. (14 August 2003), "Global surface temperatures over the past two millennia" (PDF), Geophysical Research Letters, 30 (15): 1820, Bibcode:2003GeoRL..30.1820M, doi:10.1029/2003GL017814, S2CID 5942198

2004

- Briffa, K. R.; Osborn, T. J.; Schweingruber, F. H. (January 2004), "Large-scale temperature inferences from tree rings: A review", Global and Planetary Change, 40 (1–2): 11–26, Bibcode:2004GPC....40...11B, doi:10.1016/S0921-8181(03)00095-X
- Jones, P. D.; Mann, M. E. (6 May 2004), "Climate over past millennia" (PDF), Reviews of Geophysics, 42 (2): RG2002, Bibcode:2004RvGeo..42.2002J, doi:10.1029/2003RG000143, S2CID 2937939
- Pollack, Henry N.; Smerdon, Jason E. (5 June 2004), "Borehole climate reconstructions: Spatial structure and hemispheric averages" (PDF), Journal of Geophysical Research, 109 (D11106): D11106, Bibcode:2004JGRD..10911106P, doi:10.1029/2003JD004163, hdl:2027.42/95092
- Mann, Michael E.; Bradley, Raymond S.; Hughes, Malcolm K. (1 July 2004), "Corrigendum: Global-scale temperature patterns and climate forcing over the past six centuries" (PDF), Nature, 430 (6995): 105, Bibcode:2004Natur.430..105M, doi:10.1038/nature02478
- Cook, Edward R.; Esper, Jan; D'Arrigo, Rosanne D. (November 2004), "Extra-tropical Northern Hemisphere land temperature variability over the past 1000 years", Quaternary Science Reviews, 23 (20–22): 2063–2074, Bibcode:2004QSRv...23.2063C, doi:10.1016/j.quascirev.2004.08.013

2005

- Moberg, Anders; Sonechkin, Dmitry M.; Holmgren, Karin; Datsenko, Nina M.; Karlén, Wibjörn; Lauritzen, S. E. (10 February 2005), "Highly variable Northern Hemisphere temperatures reconstructed from low- and high-resolution proxy data", Nature, 433 (7026): 613–617, Bibcode:2005Natur.433..613M, doi:10.1038/nature03265, PMID 15703742, S2CID 4359264. Corrigendum: Moberg et al. 2006 date=2011-03-07
- Oerlemans, J. (29 April 2005), "Extracting a Climate Signal from 169 Glacier Records", Science, 308 (5722): 675–677, Bibcode:2005Sci...308..675O, doi:10.1126/science.1107046, PMID 15746388, S2CID 26585604
- Rutherford, S.; Mann, Michael E.; Osborn, T. J.; Briffa, Keith R.; Jones, Phil D.; Bradley, Raymond S.; Hughes, Malcolm K. (July 2005), "Proxy-Based Northern Hemisphere Surface Temperature Reconstructions: Sensitivity to Method, Predictor Network, Target Season, and Target Domain" (PDF), Journal of Climate, 18 (13): 2308–2329, Bibcode:2005JCli...18.2308R, doi:10.1175/JCLI3351.1, S2CID 7098694

2006

- D'Arrigo, Rosanne; Wilson, Rob; Jacoby, Gordon (7 February 2006), "On the long-term context for late twentieth century warming", Journal of Geophysical Research, 111 (D03103): D03103, Bibcode:2006JGRD..111.3103D, doi:10.1029/2005JD006352
- Osborn, Timothy J.; Briffa, Keith R. (10 February 2006), "The Spatial Extent of 20th-Century Warmth in the Context of the Past 1200 Years", Science, 311 (5762): 841–844, Bibcode:2006Sci...311..841O, doi:10.1126/science.1120514, PMID 16469924, S2CID 129718548
- Moberg, Anders; Sonechkin, Dimitry M.; Holmgren, Karin; Datsenko, Nina M.; Karlén, Wibjörn; Lauritzen, Stein-Erik (23 February 2006), "Corrigendum: Highly variable Northern Hemisphere temperatures reconstructed from low- and high-resolution proxy data", Nature, 439 (7079): 1014, Bibcode:2006Natur.439.1014M, doi:10.1038/nature04575
- Hegerl, Gabriele C.; Crowley, Thomas J.; Hyde, William T.; Frame, David J. (20 April 2006), "Climate sensitivity constrained by temperature reconstructions over the past seven centuries", Nature, 440 (7087): 1029–1032, Bibcode:2006Natur.440.1029H, doi:10.1038/nature04679, PMID 16625192, S2CID 4387059
- Smith, Claire L.; Baker, Andy; Fairchild, Ian J.; Frisia, Silvia; Borsato, Andrea (3 May 2006), "Reconstructing hemispheric-scale climates from multiple stalagmite records", International Journal of Climatology, 26 (10): 1417, Bibcode:2006IJCli..26.1417S, doi:10.1002/joc.1329, hdl:2381/20592, S2CID 128393190, Figure 1
- North, Gerald R.; Biondi, Franco; Bloomfield, Peter; Christy, John R.; Cuffey, Kurt M.; Dickinson, Robert E.; Druffel, Ellen R. M.; Nychka, Douglas; Otto-Bliesner, B.; Roberts, N.; Turekian, K.; Wallace, J. (22 June 2006), Surface temperature reconstructions for the last 2,000 years, Washington, D.C.: National Academies Press, ISBN 978-0-309-10225-4. (North Report)

2007

- Juckes, M. N.; Allen, M. R.; Briffa, K. R.; Esper, J.; Hegerl, G. C.; Moberg, Anders; Osborn, T. J.; Weber, S. L. (5 October 2007), "Millennial temperature reconstruction intercomparison and evaluation", Climate of the Past, 3 (4): 591, Bibcode:2007CliPa...3..591J, doi:10.5194/cp-3-591-2007
- Jansen et al. "Chapter 6: Palaeoclimate". In IPCC AR4 WG1 (2007).
- IPCC AR4 WG1 (2007), Solomon, S.; Qin, D.; Manning, M.; Chen, Z.; Marquis, M.; Avery, K.B.; Tignor, M.; Miller, H.L. (eds.), Climate Change 2007: The Physical Science Basis, Contribution of Working Group I to the Fourth Assessment Report of the Intergovernmental Panel on Climate Change, Cambridge University Press, ISBN 978-0-521-88009-1 (pb: 978-0-521-70596-7)

2008

- Huang, S.; Pollack, H. N.; Shen, P. Y. (4 July 2008), "A late Quaternary climate reconstruction based on borehole heat flux data, borehole temperature data, and the instrumental record" (PDF), Geophysical Research Letters, 35 (L13703): L13703, Bibcode:2008GeoRL..3513703H, doi:10.1029/2008GL034187, hdl:2027.42/95180, S2CID 11399172, archived from the original (PDF) on 27 February 2012
- Lee, Terry C. K.; Zwiers, Francis W.; Tsao, Min (1 August 2008), "Evaluation of proxy-based millennial reconstruction methods" (PDF), Climate Dynamics, 31 (2–3): 263–281, Bibcode:2008ClDy...31..263L, doi:10.1007/s00382-007-0351-9, S2CID 3325498.
- Mann, Michael E.; Zhang, Zhihua; Hughes, Malcolm K.; Bradley, Raymond S.; Miller, Sonya K.; Rutherford, Scott; Ni, Fenbiao (9 September 2008), "Proxy-based reconstructions of hemispheric and global surface temperature variations over the past two millennia", Proceedings of the National Academy of Sciences of the United States of America, 105 (36): 13252–13257, Bibcode:2008PNAS..10513252M, doi:10.1073/pnas.0805721105, PMC 2527990, PMID 18765811

2009

- Bello, David (4 September 2009), "Global Warming Reverses Long-Term Arctic Cooling", Scientific American
- Jones, Phil D.; Briffa, Keith R.; Osborn, T. J.; Lough, J. M.; van Ommen, T. D.; Vinther, B. M.; Luterbacher, J.; Wahl, Eugene R.; Zwiers, F. W. (February 2009), "High-resolution palaeoclimatology of the last millennium: a review of current status and future prospects" (PDF), The Holocene, 19 (1): 3–49, doi:10.1177/0959683608098952, S2CID 129606908.
- Kaufman, Darrel; Schneider, David P.; McKay, Nicholas P.; Ammann, Caspar M.; Bradley, Raymond S.; Briffa, Keith R.; Miller, Gifford H.; Otto-Bliesner, Bette L.; Overpeck, Jonathan T.; Vinther, Bo M.; Arctic Lakes 2k Project Members (4 September 2009), "Recent warming reverses long-term arctic cooling", Science, 325 (5945): 1236–1239, Bibcode:2009Sci...325.1236K, doi:10.1126/science.1173983, PMID 19729653, S2CID 23844037
- Appell, David (28 October 2009), "Novel Analysis Confirms Climate "Hockey Stick" Graph", Scientific American
- Mann, Michael E.; Zhang, Zhihua; Rutherford, Scott; Bradley, Raymond S.; Hughes, Malcolm K.; Shindell, Ddrew; Ammann, Caspar M.; Faluvegi, Greg; Ni, Fenbiao (27 November 2009), "Global Signatures and Dynamical Origins of the Little Ice Age and Medieval Climate Anomaly", Science, 326 (5957): 1256–1260, Bibcode:2009Sci...326.1256M, doi:10.1126/science.1177303, PMID 19965474, S2CID 18655276

2010

- Tingley, Martin P.; Huybers, Peter (May 2010a), "A Bayesian Algorithm for Reconstructing Climate Anomalies in Space and Time. Part I: Development and Applications to Paleoclimate Reconstruction Problems", Journal of Climate, 23 (10): 2759–2781, Bibcode:2010JCli...23.2759T, doi:10.1175/2009JCLI3015.1, S2CID 4709675
- Tingley, Martin P.; Huybers, Peter (May 2010b), "A Bayesian Algorithm for Reconstructing Climate Anomalies in Space and Time. Part II: Comparison with the Regularized Expectation–Maximization Algorithm", Journal of Climate, 23 (10): 2782–2800, Bibcode:2010JCli...23.2782T, doi:10.1175/2009JCLI3016.1, S2CID 4709733
- Frank, David; Esper, Jan; Zorita, Eduardo; Wilson, Rob (14 May 2010), "A noodle, hockey stick, and spaghetti plate: A perspective on high-resolution paleoclimatology", Wiley Interdisciplinary Reviews: Climate Change, 1 (4): 507, doi:10.1002/wcc.53, S2CID 16524970
- Russell, Sir Muir; Boulton, Geoffrey; Clark, Peter; Eyton, David; Norton, James (7 July 2010), The Independent Climate Change E-mails Review (PDF) "ICCER"
- Ljungqvist, F. C. (September 2010), "A New Reconstruction of Temperature Variability in the Extra-Tropical Northern Hemisphere During the Last Two Millennia" (PDF), Geografiska Annaler: Series A, Physical Geography, 92 (3): 339–351, doi:10.1111/j.1468-0459.2010.00399.x, S2CID 55018654

2011

- Christiansen, B.; Ljungqvist, F. C. (December 2011), "Reconstruction of the Extratropical NH Mean Temperature over the Last Millennium with a Method that Preserves Low-Frequency Variability", Journal of Climate, 24 (23): 6013, Bibcode:2011JCli...24.6013C, doi:10.1175/2011JCLI4145.1, S2CID 140553250 (reply to comments by A. Moberg)

2012

- Ljungqvist, F. C.; Krusic, P. J.; Brattström, G.; Sundqvist, H. S. (3 February 2012), "Northern Hemisphere temperature patterns in the last 12 centuries", Climate of the Past, 8 (1): 227, Bibcode:2012CliPa...8..227L, doi:10.5194/cp-8-227-2012
- Mann, Michael E. (6 March 2012), The Hockey Stick and the Climate Wars: Dispatches from the Front Lines, Columbia University Press, ISBN 978-0-231-15254-9
- Christiansen, B.; Ljungqvist, F. C. (18 April 2012), "The extra-tropical Northern Hemisphere temperature in the last two millennia: Reconstructions of low-frequency variability", Climate of the Past, 8 (2): 765, Bibcode:2012CliPa...8..765C, doi:10.5194/cp-8-765-2012

2013

- Lemonick, Michael D. (7 March 2013), Climate to Warm Beyond Levels Seen for 11,300 Years, Climate Central
- Gillis, Justin (7 March 2013), "Global Temperatures Highest in 4,000 Years, Study Says - NYTimes.com", New York Times
- Marcott, S. A.; Shakun, J. D.; Clark, P. U.; Mix, A. C. (8 March 2013), "A Reconstruction of Regional and Global Temperature for the Past 11,300 Years", Science, 339 (6124): 1198–1201, Bibcode:2013Sci...339.1198M, doi:10.1126/science.1228026, PMID 23471405, S2CID 29665980
- Masson-Delmotte V, Schulz M, Abe-Ouchi A, Beer J, Ganopolski A, Rouco JG, et al. (2013). "Chapter 5: Information from Paleoclimate Archives" (PDF). In Stocker TF, Qin D, Plattner GK, Tignor M, Allen SK, Boschung J, et al. (eds.). Climate Change 2013: The Physical Science Basis. Contribution of Working Group I to the Fifth Assessment Report of the Intergovernmental Panel on Climate Change. Cambridge, United Kingdom and New York, NY, USA: Cambridge University Press. pp. 383–464. ISBN 978-1-107-05799-9. Archived (PDF) from the original on 6 December 2017.
- PAGES 2k Consortium, Moinuddin; Anchukaitis, Kevin J.; Asrat, Asfawossen; Borgaonkar, Hemant P.; Braida, Martina; Buckley, Brendan M.; Büntgen, Ulf; Chase, Brian M.; Christie, Duncan A.; Cook, Edward R.; Curran, Mark A. J.; Diaz, Henry F.; Esper, Jan; Fan, Ze-Xin; Gaire, Narayan P.; Ge, Quansheng; Gergis, Joëlle; González-Rouco, J Fidel; Goosse, Hugues; Grab, Stefan W.; Graham, Nicholas; Graham, Rochelle; Grosjean, Martin; Hanhijärvi, Sami T.; Kaufman, Darrell S.; Kiefer, Thorsten; Kimura, Katsuhiko; Korhola, Atte A.; Krusic, Paul J.; et al. (21 April 2013), "Continental-scale temperature variability during the past two millennia" (PDF), Nature Geoscience, 6 (5): 339, Bibcode:2013NatGe...6..339P, doi:10.1038/ngeo1797 (78 researchers, corresponding author Darrell S. Kaufman)
- Shi, F.; Yang, B.; Mairesse, A.; von Gunten, L.; Li, J.; Bräuning, A.; Yang, F.; Xiao, X. (2013), "Northern Hemisphere temperature reconstruction during the last millennium using multiple annual proxies", Climate Research, 56 (3): 231, Bibcode:2013ClRes..56..231S, doi:10.3354/cr01156, S2CID 54719300 pdf
