= Sarah Raper =

Climatologist

- Born: 3 July 1952 (age 74)
- Education: University of East Anglia
- Spouse: Keith Briffa
- Scientific career
- Workplaces: Met Office; University of East Anglia; Alfred Wegener Institute for Polar and Marine Research; Manchester Metropolitan University
- Thesis: Variations in the incidence of tropical cyclones and relationships with the global circulation (1978)

Sarah Christian Broun Raper (born 3 July 1952) is a climatologist who is currently a Research Fellow at Manchester Metropolitan University.

She graduated from the School of Environmental Sciences at the University of East Anglia in 1974 and completed her PhD on Hurricanes and Climate Change at the Climatic Research Unit (CRU) in 1978. She subsequently became a Senior Research Associate at the CRU, funded by the US Department of Energy.

She co-authored the MAGICC model (Model for the Assessment of Greenhouse-gas induced Climate Change) which gives future global temperature and sea-level over the next century in response to greenhouse gas emissions. The MAGICC model has been used by all the IPCC reports to date and is used as the climate module for many Integrated Assessment Models (IAMs).

She contributed to the Intergovernmental Panel on Climate Change reports and was a lead author on the Projections chapters of the Third and Fourth Assessment Reports.

She has an h-index of 57 according to Google Scholar.
