= An Appeal to Reason =

2008 book by Nigel Lawson

An Appeal to Reason: A Cool Look at Global Warming
- First edition cover
- Author: Nigel Lawson
- Language: English
- Genre: Non-fiction
- Publisher: Overlook Duckworth (UK); The Overlook Press (US)
- Publication date: 2008-04-10 (UK); 2008-05-29 (US)
- Publication place: United Kingdom/United States
- Media type: Print (Hardcover)
- Pages: 149
- ISBN: 978-0-7156-3786-9 (UK); ISBN 978-1-59020-084-1 (US)
- OCLC: 183267827

An Appeal to Reason: A Cool Look at Global Warming is a 2008 pseudoscientific climate change denial book by Nigel Lawson. In it, Lawson claims that, although global warming is happening, the science is far from settled. He opposes the scientific consensus as summarized by the Intergovernmental Panel on Climate Change (IPCC). He also argues that warming will bring both benefits and negative consequences, and that the impact of these changes will be relatively moderate rather than apocalyptic. The book has been rejected by climatologists, including IPCC authors Jean Palutikof and Robert Watson as unscientific.

== Overview ==
This book is an expansion of a lecture which Lawson gave in 2006 to the Centre for Policy Studies, a think tank with links to the Conservative Party. The lecture was called "The Economics and Politics of Climate Change. An Appeal to Reason" The book claims to examine each of the dimensions of the global warming issue, including the science, the economics, both from the perspective of long-term forecasting and cost-effectiveness analysis, the politics, and the ethical aspect. The book begins by arguing that "the science of global warming is far from settled." Although Lawson accepts that warming is real, he questions the validity of global climate models.

=== Book reviews ===
The book has been reviewed by, amongst others, Nature Reports Climate Change, Literary Review, The Guardian, The Spectator, and The Daily Telegraph.

=== Scientific judgment ===
James Dent reviewed the book in the Royal Meteorological Society's journal Weather. Robert Watson, the former Chair of the IPCC, accused Lawson of selective quotation and not understanding "the current scientific and economic debate". He also wrote in a letter to a newspaper: "Lord Lawson's perspective that the UK and Europe are over-reacting to the threat of human-induced climate change is substantially wrong and ignores a significant body of scientific, technological and economic evidence."

Sir John Houghton reported that "Although Lawson makes some worthwhile critiques of energy policy,... his book is largely one of misleading messages." Lawson ignores or misunderstands the science, brushes off economic analysis by the International Energy Agency, and lumps respected scientists with purveyors of nonsense. Jean Palutikof, one of the authors of a new IPCC report, said: "By the time you get past 2050 the winners become fewer and fewer. By 2100, we will be losing almost everywhere." She also said that Lawson's view was "very wrong" when it came to the availability of water.

In 2008, scientists from the Met Office's Hadley Centre responded to Lawson's contention that there has been no global warming since 2000, saying this was due to the La Niña cooling event of early 2007.
