= Tom Wigley =

Climate scientist

- Born: Tom Michael Lampe Wigley; 18 January 1940 (age 86); Adelaide, South Australia
- Citizenship: Australia, British, United States
- Education: University of Adelaide
- Scientific career
- Workplaces: University of Adelaide; National Center for Atmospheric Research; University of East Anglia
- Doctoral students: Keith Briffa; Benjamin D. Santer; Tim Osborn

Tom Michael Lampe Wigley is a climate scientist at the University of Adelaide. He is also affiliated with the University Corporation for Atmospheric Research (UCAR, Boulder, CO). He was named a fellow of the American Association for the Advancement of Science (AAAS) for his major contributions to climate and carbon cycle modeling and to climate data analysis, and because he is "one of the world's foremost experts on climate change and one of the most highly cited scientists in the discipline." He has contributed to many of the reports published by the Intergovernmental Panel on Climate Change (IPCC), a body that was recognized in 2007 by the joint award of the 2007 Nobel Peace Prize.

Wigley was educated as a mathematical physicist and earned his doctorate (1968) at the University of Adelaide in Australia. In between his undergraduate and graduate degrees he trained as a meteorologist with the (Australian) Commonwealth Bureau of Meteorology. After his Ph.D., he taught in the Dept. of Mechanical Engineering at the University of Waterloo (Ontario, Canada) for seven years. In 1975 he moved to England, where he served as the director of the Climatic Research Unit^{[5]} at the University of East Anglia from 1978 to 1993. In 1993 he moved to the National Center for Atmospheric Research in Boulder, Colorado, where he was appointed a senior scientist in 1994. He subsequently moved back to the University of Adelaide where he held an ARC DORA Professorial Fellowship (2012 to 2016). He currently (2023) holds an Adjunct Professorial position at that institution.

His published papers include the first paper to demonstrate 20th century warming using both land and marine data^{[7]}, the first paper to include the emissions-based effects of aerosol cooling on projections of future climate change^{[8]}, the first paper to provide realistic scenarios for the stabilization of atmospheric CO_{2} concentration^{[9]}, the first paper to use pattern-based methods to identify a statistically-significant human influence on the climate^{[10]}, the first paper to give probabilistic projections for future changes in global-mean temperature^{[11]}, and one of the first papers to use statistical downscaling to derive high-resolution climate information from coarse-resolution gridded climate model output^{[12]}. With colleagues Sarah Raper and Malte Meinshausen he developed the widely-used MAGICC coupled gas-cycle/climate model^{[13]}.

Wigley has also published a number of papers in aqueous carbonate geochemistry, including a standard method for carbon dating of groundwater^{[14]}, and, with Niel Plummer, highly-cited papers on the dissolution kinetics of calcite^{[15]} and mixing of carbonate waters^{[16]}.

Wigley has argued in publications and the popular media that the IPCC has been too optimistic about the prospect of averting harmful climate change by reducing greenhouse gas emissions through the use of renewable technologies alone^{[17]}, and argued that any realistic mitigation portfolio must include significant contributions from nuclear energy^{[18]}. He has also pointed out that "the human-induced [climate] changes that are expected over the next 100 years are much greater than any changes that societies have experienced in the past." In 2015, with other leading experts, he was co-author of an open letter to policy makers, which stated that "continued opposition to nuclear power threatens humanity's ability to avoid dangerous climate change."^{[19,20]}

== Articles ==
- Charlson, Robert J.; Tom M. L. Wigley (February 1994). "Sulfate Aerosol and Climatic Change". Scientific American. 270 (2): 28–35. doi:10.1038/scientificamerican0294-48.
- Wigley, Tom M.L.; L.N. Plummer; F.J. Pearson (1978). "Mass transfer and carbon isotope evolution in natural water systems". Geochimica et Cosmochimica Acta. 42 (8): 1117–1139. doi:10.1016/0016-7037(78)90108-4.
- Wigley, Tom M.L.; K.R. Briffa; P.D. Jones (1984). "On the average value of correlated time series, with applications in dendroclimatology and hydrometeorology". Journal of Climate and Applied Meteorology. 23 (2): 201–213. doi:10.1175/1520-0450(1984)023<0201:otavoc>2.0.co;2.
- Jones, P.D.; Tom M.L. Wigley; P.B. Wright (1986). "Global temperature variations between 1861 and 1984". Nature. 322 (6078): 430–434. doi:10.1038/322430a0. S2CID 4245929.
- Wigley, Tom M.L.; S.C.B. Raper (1992). "Implications for climate and sea level of revised IPCC emissions scenarios". Nature. 357 (6376): 293–300. doi:10.1038/357293a0. S2CID 4347865.
- Wigley, Tom M.L.; R. Richels; J.A. Edmonds (1996). "Economic and environmental choices in the stabilization of atmospheric CO_{2}". Nature. 379 (6562): 240–243. doi:10.1038/379240a0. S2CID 25702535.
- Santer, B.D.; K.E. Taylor; Tom M.L. Wigley; T.C. Johns; P.D. Jones; D.J. Karoly; J.F.B. Mitchell; A.H. Oort; J.E. Penner; V. Ramaswamy; M.D. Schwarzkopf; R.J. Stouffer; S. Tett (1996). "A search for human influences on the thermal structure of the atmosphere". Nature. 382 (6586): 39–46. doi:10.1038/382039a0.
- Heard, B P; B W Brook; T M L Wigley; C J A Bradshaw (2017). "Burden of proof: A comprehensive review of the feasibility of 100% renewable-electricity systems". Renewable and Sustainable Energy Reviews. 76: 1122–1133. doi:10.1016/j.rser.2017.03.114.
