= Keith Briffa =

British climatologist (1952–2017)

- Born: 27 December 1952
- Died: 29 October 2017 (aged 64)
- Education: University of East Anglia
- Spouse: Sarah Raper
- Scientific career
- Workplaces: University of East Anglia
- Thesis: Tree-climate relationships and dendroclimatological reconstruction in British Isles (1984)
- Doctoral advisor: Tom Wigley

Keith Raphael Briffa (27 December 1952 – 29 October 2017) was a climatologist and deputy director of the Climatic Research Unit. He authored or co-authored over 130 scholarly articles, chapters and books. In his professional work, he focused on climate variability in the late Holocene, with a special focus on northern portions of Europe and Asia. Briffa's preferred method was dendroclimatology, which is a set of procedures intended to decode information about the past climate from tree rings. Briffa helped develop data sets from trees from Canada, Fennoscandia, and northern Siberia which have been used in climate research.

Briffa grew up in Speke, and attended St Francis Xavier's College, Liverpool. He studied biological sciences at the University of East Anglia. He completed his PhD at the University of East Anglia entitled "Tree-climate relationships and dendroclimatological reconstruction in British Isles" in 1984.

From 1994 to 2000, Briffa served on the scientific steering committee (SSC) of the PAGES project; more recently he also served on SSCs for the UK NERC Rapid Climate Change and the European Science Foundation's HOLIVAR program.

Briffa served as Lead Author on chapter 6 (Paleoclimatology) of working group I of the 2007 IPCC Fourth Assessment Report of the Intergovernmental Panel on Climate Change.

Briffa previously served as associate editor of the scholarly journals The Holocene, Boreas and Dendrochronologia.

He had an h-index of 81 according to Semantic Scholar.

Keith Briffa died in 2017 after a number of bouts of cancer.

== Selected publications ==
- Briffa K.R.; et al. (2013). "Reassessing the evidence for tree-growth and inferred temperature change during the Common Era in Yamalia, northwest Siberia". Quaternary Science Reviews. 72: 83–107. Bibcode:2013QSRv...72...83B. doi:10.1016/j.quascirev.2013.04.008.
- Briffa K.R.; et al. (2008). "Trends in recent temperature and radial tree growth spanning 2000 years across northwest Eurasia". Phil. Trans. R. Soc. B. 363 (1501): 2269–82. doi:10.1098/rstb.2007.2199. PMC 2606779. PMID 18048299.
- Osborn T.J. and K.R. Briffa (2006). "The spatial extent of 20th-century warmth in the context of the past 1200 years". Science. 311 (5762): 841–4. Bibcode:2006Sci...311..841O. doi:10.1126/science.1120514. PMID 16469924. S2CID 129718548.
- Briffa K.R.; et al. (2002). "Unusual twentieth-century summer warmth in a 1,000-year temperature record from Siberia". Nature. 376 (6536): 156–9. Bibcode:1995Natur.376..156B. doi:10.1038/376156a0. S2CID 4327234.
- Briffa K.R.; et al. (2001). "Low-frequency temperature variations from a northern tree ring density network" (PDF). Journal of Geophysical Research. 106 (D3) (D3): 2929–2941. Bibcode:2001JGR...106.2929B. doi:10.1029/2000JD900617. S2CID 129031846.
- Briffa, K.R. (2000). "Annual climate variability in the Holocene: interpreting the message of ancient trees". Quaternary Science Reviews. 19 (1–5): 87–105. Bibcode:2000QSRv...19...87B. doi:10.1016/S0277-3791(99)00056-6.
