= List of countries by average yearly temperature =

This is a list of countries and sovereign states by temperature.

Average yearly temperature is calculated by averaging the minimum and maximum daily temperatures in the country, averaged for the years 1991 – 2020, from World Bank Group, derived from raw gridded climatologies from the Climatic Research Unit.

	Country or region	Continent	Temperature
1	Burkina Faso	Africa	30.40 °C (86.72 °F)
2	Mali	Africa	29.21 °C (84.58 °F)
3	Aruba	South America	29.17 °C (84.51 °F)
4	Senegal	Africa	28.90 °C (84.02 °F)
5	Mauritania	Africa	28.82 °C (83.88 °F)
6	Tokelau	Oceania	28.71 °C (83.68 °F)
7	Tuvalu	Oceania	28.62 °C (83.52 °F)
8	Djibouti	Africa	28.49 °C (83.28 °F)
9	Curaçao	North America	28.40 °C (83.12 °F)
10	Gambia	Africa	28.38 °C (83.08 °F)
11	United Arab Emirates	Asia	28.17 °C (82.71 °F)
12	Maldives	Asia	28.11 °C (82.60 °F)
13	Niger	Africa	28.04 °C (82.47 °F)
14	Benin	Africa	28.02 °C (82.44 °F)
15	Qatar	Asia	28.02 °C (82.44 °F)
16	Marshall Islands	Oceania	28.01 °C (82.42 °F)
17	Guinea-Bissau	Africa	27.98 °C (82.36 °F)
18	South Sudan	Africa	27.97 °C (82.35 °F)
19	Sudan	Africa	27.95 °C (82.31 °F)
20	Palau	Oceania	27.90 °C (82.22 °F)
21	Nauru	Oceania	27.83 °C (82.09 °F)
22	Cayman Islands	North America	27.82 °C (82.08 °F)
23	Guam	Oceania	27.81 °C (82.06 °F)
24	Kiribati	Oceania	27.77 °C (81.99 °F)
25	Anguilla	North America	27.71 °C (81.88 °F)
26	Saint Martin	North America	27.71 °C (81.88 °F)
27	Sint Maarten	North America	27.71 °C (81.88 °F)
28	Bahrain	Asia	27.69 °C (81.84 °F)
29	Singapore	Asia	27.68 °C (81.82 °F)
30	Ghana	Africa	27.66 °C (81.79 °F)
31	Oman	Asia	27.64 °C (81.75 °F)
32	Chad	Africa	27.63 °C (81.73 °F)
33	British Indian Ocean Territory	Africa	27.61 °C (81.70 °F)
34	Northern Mariana Islands	Oceania	27.60 °C (81.68 °F)
35	Samoa	Oceania	27.58 °C (81.64 °F)
36	Caribbean Netherlands	North America	27.47 °C (81.45 °F)
37	Saint Kitts and Nevis	North America	27.47 °C (81.45 °F)
38	Cambodia	Asia	27.41 °C (81.34 °F)
39	American Samoa	Oceania	27.38 °C (81.28 °F)
40	Togo	Africa	27.33 °C (81.19 °F)
41	Nigeria	Africa	27.30 °C (81.14 °F)
42	Wallis and Futuna	Oceania	27.30 °C (81.14 °F)
43	Federated States of Micronesia	Oceania	27.28 °C (81.10 °F)
44	Sri Lanka	Asia	27.25 °C (81.05 °F)
45	Antigua and Barbuda	North America	27.20 °C (80.96 °F)
46	Philippines	Asia	27.10 °C (80.78 °F)
47	Seychelles	Africa	27.09 °C (80.76 °F)
48	Saint Lucia	North America	27.00 °C (80.60 °F)
49	United States Virgin Islands	North America	26.98 °C (80.56 °F)
50	Brunei	Asia	26.95 °C (80.51 °F)
51	Somalia	Africa	26.95 °C (80.51 °F)
52	Thailand	Asia	26.85 °C (80.33 °F)
53	Dominica	North America	26.83 °C (80.29 °F)
54	Ivory Coast	Africa	26.80 °C (80.24 °F)
55	Cocos (Keeling) Islands	Oceania	26.79 °C (80.22 °F)
56	British Virgin Islands	North America	26.70 °C (80.06 °F)
57	Eritrea	Africa	26.63 °C (79.93 °F)
58	Barbados	North America	26.61 °C (79.90 °F)
59	Suriname	South America	26.58 °C (79.84 °F)
60	Trinidad and Tobago	North America	26.55 °C (79.79 °F)
61	Sierra Leone	Africa	26.54 °C (79.77 °F)
62	Grenada	North America	26.49 °C (79.68 °F)
63	Malaysia	Asia	26.38 °C (79.48 °F)
64	Kuwait	Asia	26.31 °C (79.36 °F)
65	Turks and Caicos Islands	North America	26.29 °C (79.32 °F)
66	Saint Vincent and the Grenadines	North America	26.17 °C (79.11 °F)
67	Guyana	South America	26.12 °C (79.02 °F)
68	Christmas Island	Oceania	26.06 °C (78.91 °F)
69	Indonesia	Asia	25.96 °C (78.73 °F)
70	Saudi Arabia	Asia	25.94 °C (78.69 °F)
71	Solomon Islands	Oceania	25.92 °C (78.66 °F)
72	Jamaica	North America	25.91 °C (78.64 °F)
73	Nicaragua	Central America	25.88 °C (78.58 °F)
74	Guinea	Africa	25.86 °C (78.55 °F)
75	Cuba	North America	25.81 °C (78.46 °F)
76	Montserrat	North America	25.75 °C (78.35 °F)
77	Bangladesh	Asia	25.71 °C (78.28 °F)
78	Venezuela	South America	25.71 °C (78.28 °F)
79	Belize	Central America	25.70 °C (78.26 °F)
80	Panama	Central America	25.60 °C (78.08 °F)
81	Bahamas	North America	25.58 °C (78.04 °F)
82	Yemen	Asia	25.54 °C (77.97 °F)
83	Central African Republic	Africa	25.47 °C (77.85 °F)
84	Liberia	Africa	25.45 °C (77.81 °F)
85	Brazil	South America	25.44 °C (77.79 °F)
86	El Salvador	Central America	25.23 °C (77.41 °F)
87	Gabon	Africa	25.20 °C (77.36 °F)
88	Kenya	Africa	25.08 °C (77.14 °F)
89	Puerto Rico	North America	25.04 °C (77.07 °F)
90	Niue	Oceania	25.03 °C (77.05 °F)
91	Tonga	Oceania	25.01 °C (77.02 °F)
92	Colombia	South America	25.00 °C (77.00 °F)
93	United States Minor Outlying Islands	Oceania and North America	24.97 °C (76.95 °F)
94	Haiti	North America	24.95 °C (76.91 °F)
95	India	Asia	24.94 °C (76.89 °F)
96	Costa Rica	Central America	24.83 °C (76.69 °F)
97	Cameroon	Africa	24.80 °C (76.64 °F)
98	Vietnam	Asia	24.79 °C (76.62 °F)
99	Republic of the Congo	Africa	24.74 °C (76.53 °F)
100	Papua New Guinea	Oceania	24.74 °C (76.53 °F)
101	Honduras	Central America	24.72 °C (76.50 °F)
102	Cook Islands	Oceania	24.71 °C (76.48 °F)
103	Fiji	Oceania	24.68 °C (76.42 °F)
104	Equatorial Guinea	Africa	24.66 °C (76.39 °F)
105	Timor-Leste	Asia	24.57 °C (76.23 °F)
106	Dominican Republic	North America	24.55 °C (76.19 °F)
107	São Tomé and Príncipe	Africa	24.49 °C (76.08 °F)
108	Vanuatu	Oceania	24.44 °C (75.99 °F)
109	Mozambique	Africa	24.41 °C (75.94 °F)
110	Democratic Republic of the Congo	Africa	24.35 °C (75.83 °F)
111	French Polynesia	Oceania	24.30 °C (75.74 °F)
112	Laos	Asia	24.16 °C (75.49 °F)
113	Paraguay	South America	23.92 °C (75.06 °F)
114	Myanmar	Asia	23.82 °C (74.88 °F)
115	Comoros	Africa	23.73 °C (74.71 °F)
116	Guatemala	Central America	23.65 °C (74.57 °F)
117	Algeria	Africa	23.60 °C (74.48 °F)
118	Ethiopia	Africa	23.36 °C (74.05 °F)
119	Mauritius	Africa	23.33 °C (73.99 °F)
120	Uganda	Africa	23.25 °C (73.85 °F)
121	Egypt	Africa	23.14 °C (73.65 °F)
122	Iraq	Asia	22.95 °C (73.31 °F)
123	Tanzania	Africa	22.92 °C (73.26 °F)
124	Libya	Africa	22.81 °C (73.06 °F)
125	New Caledonia	Oceania	22.69 °C (72.84 °F)
126	Malawi	Africa	22.66 °C (72.79 °F)
127	Madagascar	Africa	22.64 °C (72.75 °F)
128	Cape Verde	Africa	22.53 °C (72.55 °F)
129	Zambia	Africa	22.23 °C (72.01 °F)
130	Botswana	Africa	22.09 °C (71.76 °F)
131	Australia	Oceania	22.05 °C (71.69 °F)
132	Zimbabwe	Africa	21.90 °C (71.42 °F)
133	Angola	Africa	21.77 °C (71.19 °F)
134	Bermuda	North America	21.67 °C (71.01 °F)
135	Ecuador	South America	21.43 °C (70.57 °F)
136	Pakistan	Asia	21.38 °C (70.48 °F)
137	Mexico	North America	21.31 °C (70.36 °F)
138	Bolivia	South America	20.76 °C (69.37 °F)
139	Eswatini	Africa	20.64 °C (69.15 °F)
140	Pitcairn Islands	Oceania	20.56 °C (69.01 °F)
141	Tunisia	Africa	20.53 °C (68.95 °F)
142	Burundi	Africa	20.51 °C (68.92 °F)
143	Namibia	Africa	20.45 °C (68.81 °F)
144	Israel	Asia	20.25 °C (68.45 °F)
145	Peru	South America	20.07 °C (68.13 °F)
146	Malta	Europe	20.06 °C (68.11 °F)
147	Jordan	Asia	20.05 °C (68.09 °F)
148	Palestine	Asia	20.04 °C (68.07 °F)
149	Rwanda	Africa	20.03 °C (68.05 °F)
150	Norfolk Island	Oceania	20.02 °C (68.04 °F)
151	Cyprus	Europe	20.01 °C (68.02 °F)
152	Syria	Asia	18.75 °C (65.75 °F)
153	Iran	Asia	18.34 °C (65.01 °F)
154	South Africa	Africa	18.23 °C (64.81 °F)
155	Gibraltar	Europe	18.15 °C (64.67 °F)
156	Morocco	Africa	18.14 °C (64.65 °F)
157	Saint Helena, Ascension and Tristan da Cunha	Africa	18.10 °C (64.58 °F)
158	Uruguay	South America	17.97 °C (64.35 °F)
159	Turkmenistan	Asia	16.66 °C (61.99 °F)
160	Argentina	South America	16.30 °C (61.34 °F)
161	Portugal	Europe	15.85 °C (60.53 °F)
162	Lebanon	Asia	15.45 °C (59.81 °F)
163	Vatican City	Europe	15.20 °C (59.36 °F)
164	Nepal	Asia	14.50 °C (58.10 °F)
165	Greece	Europe	13.17 °C (55.71 °F)
166	Spain	Europe	13.07 °C (55.53 °F)
167	Uzbekistan	Asia	13.06 °C (55.51 °F)
168	Monaco	Europe	13.05 °C (55.49 °F)
169	Afghanistan	Asia	13.04 °C (55.47 °F)
170	Italy	Europe	13.02 °C (55.44 °F)
171	Azerbaijan	Asia	12.96 °C (55.33 °F)
172	San Marino	Europe	12.83 °C (55.09 °F)
173	Albania	Europe	12.44 °C (54.39 °F)
174	Lesotho	Africa	12.38 °C (54.28 °F)
175	Jersey	Europe	12.27 °C (54.09 °F)
176	South Korea	Asia	12.22 °C (54.00 °F)
177	Guernsey	Europe	12.09 °C (53.76 °F)
178	Croatia	Europe	11.96 °C (53.53 °F)
179	Japan	Asia	11.81 °C (53.26 °F)
180	Turkey	Asia and Europe	11.66 °C (52.99 °F)
181	France	Europe	11.66 °C (52.99 °F)
182	Hungary	Europe	11.50 °C (52.70 °F)
183	Serbia	Europe	11.40 °C (52.52 °F)
184	Bulgaria	Europe	11.35 °C (52.43 °F)
185	Moldova	Europe	10.89 °C (51.60 °F)
186	North Macedonia	Europe	10.79 °C (51.42 °F)
187	Belgium	Europe	10.67 °C (51.21 °F)
188	Netherlands	Europe	10.49 °C (50.88 °F)
189	New Zealand	Oceania	10.46 °C (50.83 °F)
190	Bhutan	Asia	10.38 °C (50.68 °F)
191	Bosnia and Herzegovina	Europe	10.35 °C (50.63 °F)
192	Romania	Europe	10.18 °C (50.32 °F)
193	Kosovo	Europe	10.02 °C (50.04 °F)
194	Luxembourg	Europe	10.02 °C (50.04 °F)
195	Montenegro	Europe	9.93 °C (49.87 °F)
196	Slovenia	Europe	9.86 °C (49.75 °F)
197	Ireland	Europe	9.73 °C (49.51 °F)
198	Isle of Man	Europe	9.65 °C (49.37 °F)
199	Germany	Europe	9.58 °C (49.24 °F)
200	United States	North America	9.46 °C (49.03 °F)
201	Chile	South America	9.39 °C (48.90 °F)
202	Ukraine	Europe	9.27 °C (48.69 °F)
203	United Kingdom	Europe	9.24 °C (48.63 °F)
204	Georgia	Europe	9.01 °C (48.22 °F)
205	Denmark	Europe	8.90 °C (48.02 °F)
206	Slovakia	Europe	8.83 °C (47.89 °F)
207	Poland	Europe	8.78 °C (47.80 °F)
208	Czech Republic	Europe	8.60 °C (47.48 °F)
209	Andorra	Europe	8.27 °C (46.89 °F)
210	Armenia	Europe	7.82 °C (46.08 °F)
211	China	Asia	7.60 °C (45.68 °F)
212	Liechtenstein	Europe	7.55 °C (45.59 °F)
213	Belarus	Europe	7.45 °C (45.41 °F)
214	Austria	Europe	7.44 °C (45.39 °F)
215	Lithuania	Europe	7.38 °C (45.28 °F)
216	Kazakhstan	Asia	7.11 °C (44.80 °F)
217	North Korea	Asia	7.00 °C (44.60 °F)
218	Latvia	Europe	6.87 °C (44.37 °F)
219	Faroe Islands	Europe	6.60 °C (43.88 °F)
220	Switzerland	Europe	6.47 °C (43.65 °F)
221	Estonia	Europe	6.34 °C (43.41 °F)
222	Saint Pierre and Miquelon	North America	5.72 °C (42.30 °F)
223	French Southern and Antarctic Lands	Antarctica	4.11 °C (39.40 °F)
224	Tajikistan	Asia	3.85 °C (38.93 °F)
225	Sweden	Europe	3.23 °C (37.81 °F)
226	Kyrgyzstan	Asia	2.65 °C (36.77 °F)
227	Finland	Europe	2.46 °C (36.43 °F)
228	Heard Island and McDonald Islands	Antarctica	2.46 °C (36.43 °F)
229	Norway	Europe	2.21 °C (35.98 °F)
230	Iceland	Europe	1.85 °C (35.33 °F)
231	Mongolia	Asia	1.07 °C (33.93 °F)
232	Russia	Asia and Europe	−3.79 °C (25.18 °F)
233	Canada	North America	−4.03 °C (24.75 °F)
234	Svalbard and Jan Mayen	Europe	−6.78 °C (19.80 °F)
235	Greenland	North America	−18.68 °C (−1.62 °F)

== See also ==
- List of countries by average annual precipitation
