= Benjamin D. Santer =

American climate researcher

Benjamin David Santer
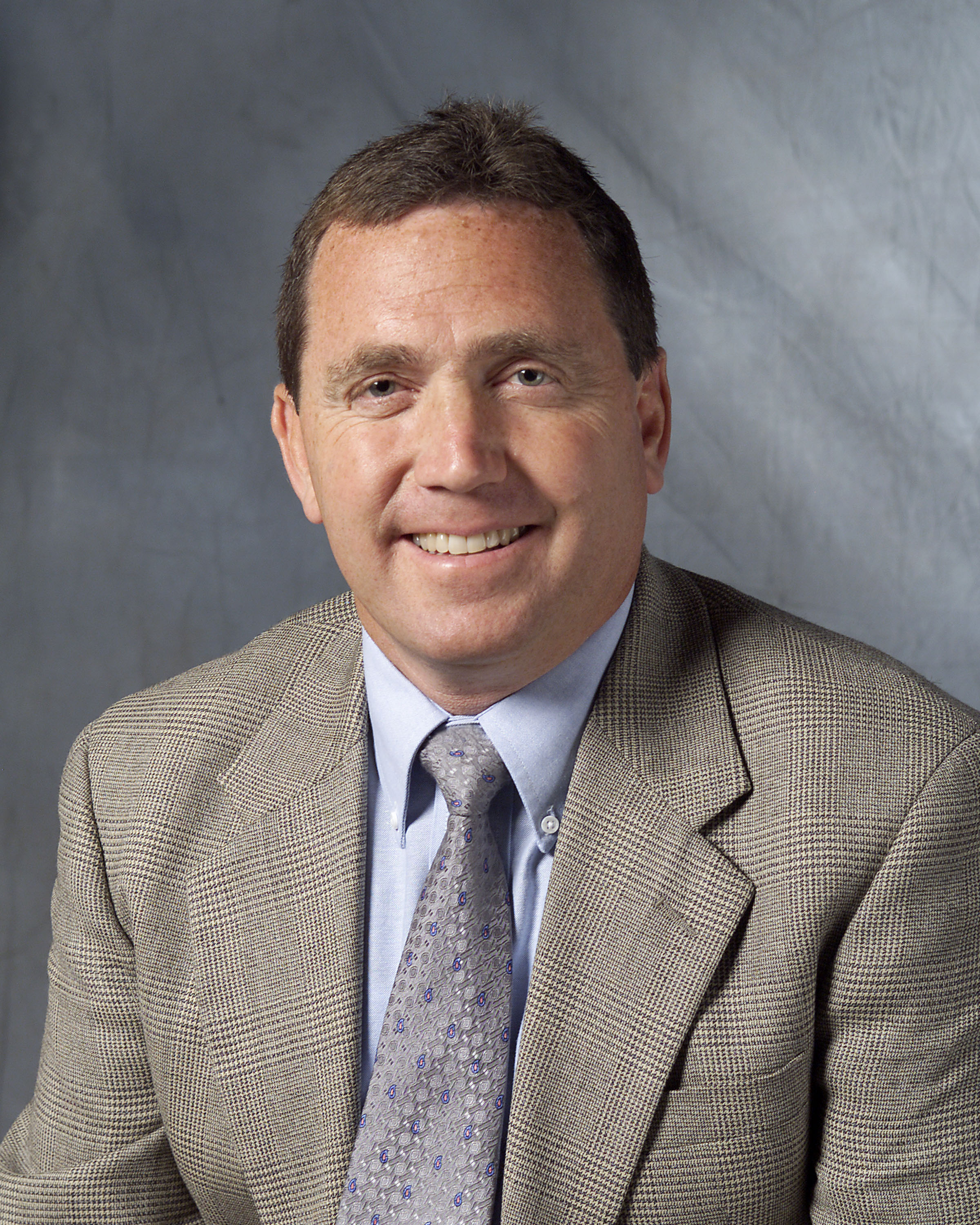
- Born: June 3, 1955 (age 71); Washington, D.C.
- Education: University of East Anglia's Climatic Research Unit
- Awards: E. O. Lawrence Award (2002)
- Scientific career
- Fields: Climatology
- Workplaces: Lawrence Livermore National Laboratory
- Thesis: Regional validation of General Circulation Models (1987)
- Doctoral advisor: Tom Wigley

Benjamin David Santer (born June 3, 1955) is a Distinguished Scholar in Residence at Woods Hole Oceanographic Institution. Previously, he was a climate researcher at Lawrence Livermore National Laboratory and at the University of East Anglia's Climatic Research Unit. He retired from the Lawrence Livermore National Laboratory in 2021. He also worked at the Max Planck Institute for Meteorology from 1987 to 1992. He specializes mainly in statistical analysis of climate data sets, and detection/attribution of climate change forcings.

Since 2012, Santer has been listed on the board of directors of the National Center for Science Education.

== Honors ==
Santer received a B.Sc. in environmental sciences and a 1987 Ph.D. in climatology from the Climatic Research Unit of the University of East Anglia.

In 1998 Santer was awarded a MacArthur Fellowship for research supporting the finding that human activity contributes to global warming. He has also received the Ernest Orlando Lawrence Award and a Distinguished Scientist Fellowship from the U.S. Department of Energy and the Norbert Gerbier/MUMM award from the World Meteorological Organization. He ranked twelfth amongst climate scientists in a 2002 assessment of most cited scientists in the field of global warming. In 2024 he received the Carl-Gustaf Rossby Research Medal of the American Meteorological Society.

In 2011, Santer was elected as a fellow of the American Geophysical Union and as a member of the National Academy of Sciences.

== 1995 AR2 Chapter 8 ==
Santer was the convening Lead Author of Chapter 8 of 1995 IPCC Working Group I Report (AR2 WGI), which addressed the global warming issue.

In a June 12, 1996 editorial-page piece in The Wall Street Journal, Frederick Seitz, chair of the George C. Marshall Institute and Science and Environmental Policy Project, claimed that alterations made to Chapter 8 of the 1995 IPCC report were made to "deceive policy makers and the public into believing that the scientific evidence shows human activities are causing global warming." Similar charges were made by the Global Climate Coalition (GCC), a consortium of industry interests; specifically, they accused Santer of "scientific cleansing."

Santer and 40 other scientists responded to The Wall Street Journal that all IPCC procedural rules were followed, and that IPCC procedures required changes to the draft in response to comments from governments, individual scientists, and non-governmental organizations. They stated that the pre- and post-Madrid versions of Chapter 8 were equally cautious in their statements; that roughly 20% of Chapter 8 is devoted to the discussion of uncertainties in estimates of natural climate variability and the expected signal due to human activities; and that both versions of the chapter reached the same conclusion: "Taken together, these results point towards a human influence on climate."

== Gold Standard Paper ==
On February 25, 2019, Santer et al. published the paper Celebrating the anniversary of three key events in climate change science in Nature Climate Change, stating that evidence had reached the 5-sigma "gold standard level" of statistical proof of human influence in global climate change using three sets of satellite data.
