= List of countries by average annual precipitation =

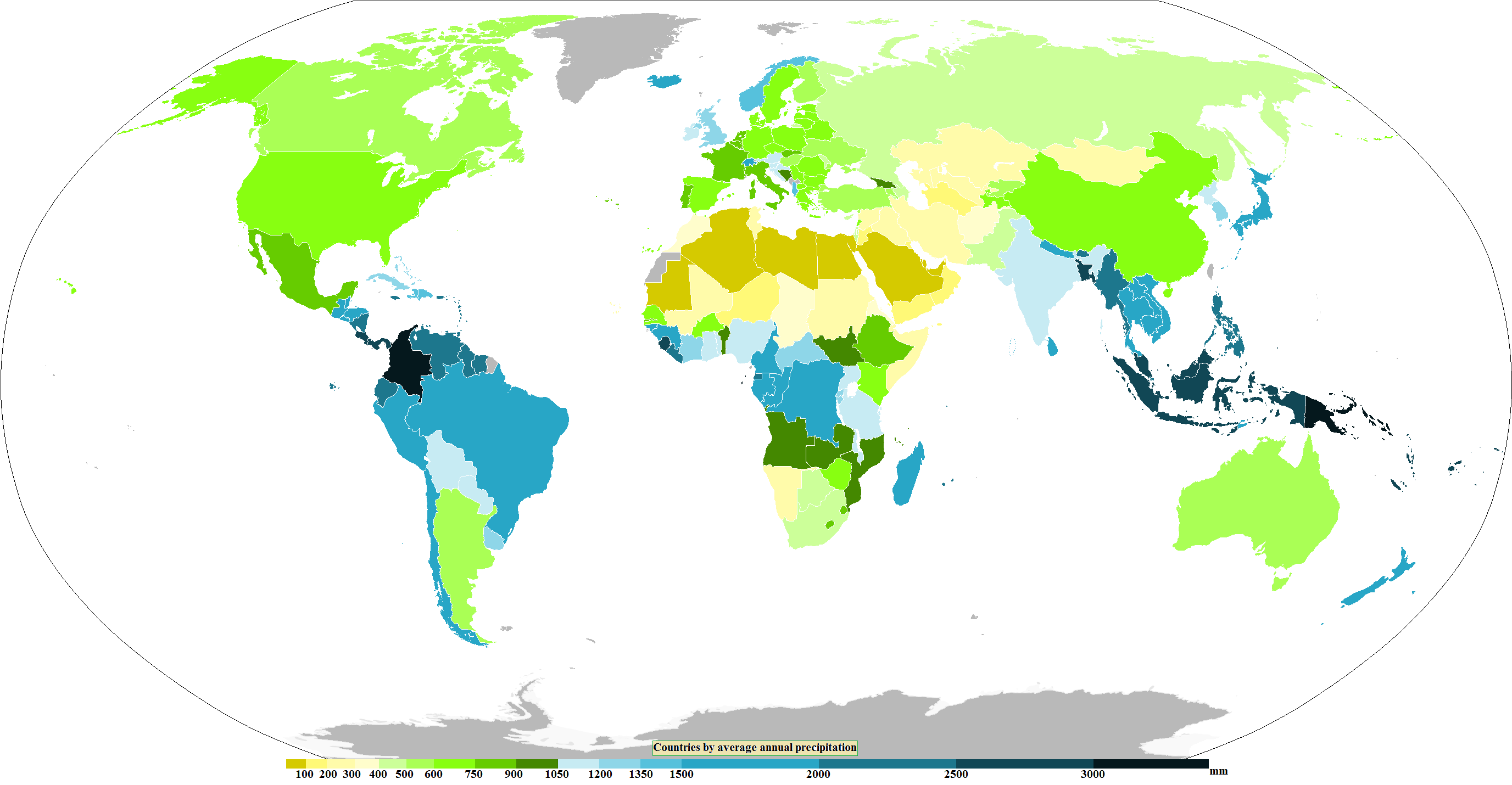
Countries by average annual precipitation

This is a list of countries by average annual precipitation.

== List ==
Per the World Bank (2017)
| | Country | mm/ year | in/ year | Continent |
|---|---|---|---|---|
| 1 | Colombia | 3,240 | 127.6 | South America |
| 2 | São Tomé and Príncipe | 3,200 | 126 | Africa |
| 2 | Tuvalu | 3,200 | 126 | Oceania |
| 4 | Papua New Guinea | 3,142 | 123.7 | Oceania |
| 5 | Solomon Islands | 3,028 | 119.2 | Oceania |
| 6 | Panama | 2,928 | 115.3 | Central America |
| 7 | Costa Rica | 2,926 | 115.2 | Central America |
| 8 | Samoa | 2,880 | 113.4 | Oceania |
| 9 | Malaysia | 2,875 | 113.2 | Asia |
| 10 | Brunei | 2,722 | 107.2 | Asia |
| 11 | Indonesia | 2,702 | 106.4 | Asia |
| 12 | Tonga | 2,700 | 110 | Oceania |
| 13 | Bangladesh | 2,666 | 105.0 | Asia |
| 14 | Fiji | 2,592 | 102.0 | Oceania |
| 15 | Sierra Leone | 2,526 | 99.4 | Africa |
| 16 | Singapore | 2,497 | 98.3 | Asia |
| 17 | Liberia | 2,391 | 94.1 | Africa |
| 18 | Guyana | 2,387 | 94.0 | South America |
| 19 | Grenada (Note: Grenada's latest measurement was in 2014.) | 2,350 | 93 | North America |
| 20 | Philippines | 2,348 | 92.4 | Asia |
| 21 | Suriname | 2,331 | 91.8 | South America |
| 22 | Seychelles | 2,330 | 92 | Africa |
| 23 | Saint Lucia | 2,301 | 90.6 | North America |
| 24 | Nicaragua | 2,280 | 90 | Central America |
| 25 | Ecuador | 2,274 | 89.5 | South America |
| 26 | Bhutan | 2,200 | 87 | Asia |
| 26 | Trinidad and Tobago | 2,200 | 87 | North America |
| 27 | Equatorial Guinea | 2,156 | 84.9 | Africa |
| 28 | Myanmar | 2,091 | 82.3 | Asia |
| 29 | Dominica | 2,083 | 82.0 | North America |
| 30 | Puerto Rico | 2,054 | 80.9 | North America |
| 31 | Jamaica | 2,051 | 80.7 | North America |
| 32 | Venezuela | 2,044 | 80.5 | South America |
| 33 | Mauritius | 2,041 | 80.4 | Africa |
| 34 | Vanuatu | 2,000 | 79 | Oceania |
| 35 | Guatemala | 1,996 | 78.6 | Central America |
| 36 | Honduras | 1,976 | 77.8 | Central America |
| 37 | Maldives | 1,972 | 77.6 | Asia |
| 38 | Iceland | 1,940 | 76 | Europe |
| 39 | Cambodia | 1,904 | 75.0 | Asia |
| 40 | Laos | 1,834 | 72.2 | Asia |
| 41 | Gabon | 1,831 | 72.1 | Africa |
| 42 | Vietnam | 1,821 | 71.7 | Asia |
| 43 | El Salvador | 1,784 | 70.2 | Central America |
| 44 | Brazil | 1,761 | 69.3 | South America |
| 45 | Peru | 1,738 | 68.4 | South America |
| 46 | New Zealand | 1,732 | 68.2 | Oceania |
| 47 | Sri Lanka | 1,712 | 67.4 | Asia |
| 48 | Belize | 1,705 | 67.1 | North America |
| 49 | Japan | 1,668 | 65.7 | Asia |
| 50 | Guinea | 1,651 | 65.0 | Africa |
| 51 | Congo | 1,646 | 64.8 | Africa |
| 52 | Thailand | 1,622 | 63.9 | Asia |
| 53 | Cameroon | 1,604 | 63.1 | Africa |
| 54 | Saint Vincent and the Grenadines | 1,583 | 62.3 | North America |
| 55 | Guinea-Bissau | 1,577 | 62.1 | Africa |
| 56 | DR Congo | 1,543 | 60.7 | Africa |
| 57 | Switzerland | 1,537 | 60.5 | Europe |
| 58 | Chile | 1,522 | 59.9 | South America |
| 59 | Madagascar | 1,513 | 59.6 | Africa |
| 60 | Timor-Leste | 1,500 | 59 | Asia |
| 60 | Nepal | 1,500 | 59 | Asia |
| 61 | Albania | 1,485 | 58.5 | Europe |
| 62 | Haiti | 1,440 | 57 | North America |
| 63 | Saint Kitts and Nevis | 1,427 | 56.2 | North America |
| 64 | Barbados | 1,422 | 56.0 | North America |
| 65 | Norway | 1,414 | 55.7 | Europe |
| 66 | Dominican Republic | 1,410 | 55.5 | North America |
| 67 | Ivory Coast | 1,348 | 53.1 | Africa |
| 68 | Central African Republic | 1,343 | 52.9 | Africa |
| 69 | Cuba | 1,335 | 52.6 | North America |
| 70 | Uruguay | 1,300 | 51 | South America |
| 71 | Bahamas | 1,292 | 50.9 | North America |
| 72 | Burundi | 1,274 | 50.2 | Africa |
| 72 | South Korea | 1,274 | 50.2 | Asia |
| 73 | United Kingdom | 1,220 | 48 | Europe |
| 74 | Rwanda | 1,212 | 47.7 | Africa |
| 75 | Ghana | 1,187 | 46.7 | Africa |
| 76 | Malawi | 1,181 | 46.5 | Africa |
| 77 | Uganda | 1,180 | 46 | Africa |
| 78 | Togo | 1,168 | 46.0 | Africa |
| 79 | Slovenia | 1,162 | 45.7 | Europe |
| 80 | Nigeria | 1,150 | 45 | Africa |
| 81 | Bolivia | 1,146 | 45.1 | South America |
| 82 | Paraguay | 1,130 | 44 | South America |
| 83 | Ireland | 1,118 | 44.0 | Europe |
| 84 | Croatia | 1,113 | 43.8 | Europe |
| 85 | Austria | 1,110 | 43.7 | Europe |
| 86 | India | 1,083 | 42.6 | Asia |
| 87 | Tanzania | 1,071 | 42.2 | Africa |
| 88 | North Korea | 1,054 | 41.5 | Asia |
| 89 | Benin | 1,039 | 40.9 | Africa |
| 90 | Mozambique | 1,032 | 40.6 | Africa |
| 91 | Antigua and Barbuda | 1,030 | 40.6 | North America |
| 92 | Bosnia and Herzegovina | 1,028 | 40.5 | Europe |
| 93 | Georgia | 1,026 | 40.4 | Asia |
| 94 | Zambia | 1,020 | 40 | Africa |
| 95 | Angola | 1,010 | 40 | Africa |
| 96 | Luxembourg | 934 | 36.8 | Europe |
| 97 | Comoros | 900 | 35 | Africa |
| 97 | South Sudan | 900 | 35 | Africa |
| 98 | France | 867 | 34.1 | Europe |
| 99 | Portugal | 854 | 33.6 | Europe |
| 100 | Ethiopia | 848 | 33.4 | Africa |
| 101 | Belgium | 847 | 33.3 | Europe |
| 102 | Gambia | 836 | 32.9 | Africa |
| 103 | Italy | 832 | 32.8 | Europe |
| 104 | Slovakia | 824 | 32.4 | Europe |
| 105 | Eswatini | 788 | 31.0 | Africa |
| 105 | Lesotho | 788 | 31.0 | Africa |
| 106 | Netherlands | 778 | 30.6 | Europe |
| 107 | Mexico | 758 | 29.8 | North America |
| 108 | Burkina Faso | 748 | 29.4 | Africa |
| 109 | United States | 715 | 28.1 | North America |
| 110 | Denmark | 703 | 27.7 | Europe |
| 111 | Germany | 700 | 27.6 | Europe |
| 112 | Tajikistan | 691 | 27.2 | Asia |
| 113 | Senegal | 686 | 27.0 | Africa |
| 114 | Czech Republic | 677 | 26.7 | Europe |
| 115 | Latvia | 667 | 26.3 | Europe |
| 116 | Lebanon | 661 | 26.0 | Asia |
| 117 | Zimbabwe | 657 | 25.9 | Africa |
| 118 | Lithuania | 656 | 25.8 | Europe |
| 119 | Greece | 652 | 25.7 | Europe |
| 120 | China | 645 | 25.4 | Asia |
| 121 | Romania | 637 | 25.1 | Europe |
| 122 | Spain | 636 | 25.0 | Europe |
| 123 | Kenya | 630 | 25 | Africa |
| 124 | Estonia | 626 | 24.6 | Europe |
| 125 | Sweden | 624 | 24.6 | Europe |
| 126 | North Macedonia | 619 | 24.4 | Europe |
| 127 | Belarus | 618 | 24.3 | Europe |
| 128 | Bulgaria | 608 | 23.9 | Europe |
| 129 | Poland | 600 | 23.6 | Europe |
| 130 | Turkey | 593 | 23.3 | Europe-Asia |
| 131 | Argentina | 591 | 23.3 | South America |
| 132 | Hungary | 589 | 23.2 | Europe |
| 133 | Ukraine | 565 | 22.2 | Europe |
| 134 | Armenia | 562 | 22.1 | Asia |
| 135 | Malta | 560 | 22 | Europe |
| 136 | Canada | 537 | 21.1 | North America |
| 137 | Finland | 536 | 21.1 | Europe |
| 138 | Australia | 534 | 21.0 | Oceania |
| 139 | Kyrgyzstan | 533 | 21.0 | Asia |
| 140 | Cyprus | 498 | 19.6 | Asia |
| 141 | South Africa | 495 | 19.5 | Africa |
| 142 | Pakistan | 494 | 19.4 | Asia |
| 143 | Russia | 460 | 18 | Europe-Asia |
| 144 | Moldova | 450 | 18 | Europe |
| 145 | Azerbaijan | 447 | 17.6 | Asia |
| 146 | Israel | 435 | 17.1 | Asia |
| 147 | Botswana | 416 | 16.4 | Africa |
| 149 | Eritrea | 384 | 15.1 | Africa |
| 150 | Morocco | 346 | 13.6 | Africa |
| 151 | Afghanistan | 327 | 12.9 | Asia |
| 152 | Chad | 322 | 12.7 | Africa |
| 153 | Namibia | 285 | 11.2 | Africa |
| 154 | Mali | 282 | 11.1 | Africa |
| 154 | Somalia | 282 | 11.1 | Africa |
| 155 | Syria | 252 | 9.9 | Asia |
| 156 | Kazakhstan | 250 | 9.8 | Asia |
| 156 | Sudan | 250 | 9.8 | Africa |
| 156 | Libya | 250 | 9.8 | Africa |
| 157 | Mongolia | 241 | 9.5 | Asia |
| 158 | Cape Verde | 228 | 9.0 | Africa |
| 159 | Iran | 228 | 9.0 | Asia |
| 160 | Djibouti | 220 | 8.7 | Africa |
| 161 | Iraq | 216 | 8.5 | Asia |
| 162 | Tunisia | 207 | 8.1 | Africa |
| 163 | Uzbekistan | 206 | 8.1 | Asia |
| 164 | Yemen | 167 | 6.6 | Asia |
| 165 | Turkmenistan | 161 | 6.3 | Asia |
| 166 | Niger | 151 | 5.9 | Africa |
| 167 | Oman | 125 | 4.9 | Asia |
| 168 | Kuwait | 121 | 4.8 | Asia |
| 169 | Jordan | 111 | 4.4 | Asia |
| 170 | Mauritania | 92 | 3.6 | Africa |
| 171 | Algeria | 89 | 3.5 | Africa |
| 172 | Bahrain | 83 | 3.3 | Asia |
| 173 | United Arab Emirates | 78 | 3.1 | Asia |
| 174 | Qatar | 74 | 2.9 | Asia |
| 175 | Saudi Arabia | 59 | 2.3 | Asia |
| 176 | Egypt | 18 | 0.71 | Africa |

== See also ==
- List of countries by average yearly temperature
