= Dendrochronologia =

International scholarly journal

- Discipline: Dendrochronology
- Language: English
- Edited by: Cristina Nabais, Rob Wilson

Publication details
- Publisher: Elsevier
- Impact factor: 2.691 (2020)

Standard abbreviations
- ISO 4: Dendrochronologia

Indexing
- ISSN: 1125-7865

Links
- Journal homepage

Dendrochronologia is, according to its website: "a peer-reviewed international scholarly journal that presents high-quality research related to growth rings of woody plants, i.e., trees and shrubs, and the application of tree-ring studies.

The areas covered by the journal include, but are not limited to: archaeology, botany, climatology, ecology, forestry, geology and hydrology."

The journal publishes original research on tree-ring studies, and other contributions are considered for publication, such as articles and reviews; there are various benefits to authors.

The current Editors-in-Chief are Cristina Nabais and Rob Wilson.
