= Rosanne D'Arrigo =

Professor of Biology and Paleoscience

Rosanne Dorothy D'Arrigo
- Education: Columbia University
- Scientific career
- Thesis: Dendrochronological modeling and reconstruction of large-scale climate variability in recent centuries and its relation to atmospheric forcing functions (1989)

Rosanne D'Arrigo is a professor at Lamont–Doherty Earth Observatory at Columbia University known for her research into climate change using dendrochronology, or dating based on tree rings.

== Education and career ==
D'Arrigo grew up in the Bronx and describes herself as a "winter weather enthusiast" when large amounts of snow required shoveling and kept her home from school. She earned her bachelors' degree and her M.A. (1980) from the State University of New York at Binghamton. She returned to New York City and became the first graduate student in Lamont–Doherty Earth Observatory's Tree Ring Laboratory where she was one of the few women working in the field on tree ring research. Her graduate class work included classes in geology and climate courses, and in 1989 she completed her Ph.D. from Columbia University.

In 2019, D'Arrigo was elected a fellow of the American Geophysical Union who cited her "for insightful, rigorous, and original contributions to the development of high-resolution paleoclimatology, particularly dendroclimatology".

== Research ==
D'Arrigo is known for her research into past climate and atmospheric conditions using tree rings, a research area called dendroclimatology. Her research includes investigations into the Asian monsoon and the impact of volcanic activity on the rainfall in Asia, linking cool weather in Scotland during the 1690s with volcanic activity, and connecting temperatures in the tropics with volcanic eruptions. Using tree-ring data from trees in Canada and Alaska, D'Arrigo has established a timeline for annual temperatures in North America over the past 300 years. In Alaska, her research has shown that cool years follow volcanic activity. During the 2009 controversy on climate change, D'Arrigo's noted that her research dating to 1995 had already published details on the divergence problem, which is the issue where warming since the 1950s does not appear in tree ring datasets. In 2020, D'Arrigo was part of the team that assessed the potential for future flooding of the Brahmaputra River under future climate change.

=== Selected publications ===
- Jacoby, Gordon C.; D'Arrigo, Rosanne (1989). "Reconstructed Northern Hemisphere annual temperature since 1671 based on high-latitude tree-ring data from North America". Climatic Change. 14 (1): 39–59. Bibcode:1989ClCh...14...39J. doi:10.1007/BF00140174. ISSN 0165-0009. S2CID 153959804.
- Jacoby, Gordon C.; D'Arrigo, Rosanne D. (1995). "Tree ring width and density evidence of climatic and potential forest change in Alaska". Global Biogeochemical Cycles. 9 (2): 227–234. Bibcode:1995GBioC...9..227J. doi:10.1029/95GB00321.
- D'Arrigo, Rosanne; Wilson, Rob; Jacoby, Gordon (2006). "On the long-term context for late twentieth century warming". Journal of Geophysical Research. 111 (D3): D03103. Bibcode:2006JGRD..111.3103D. doi:10.1029/2005JD006352. ISSN 0148-0227.
- D'Arrigo, Rosanne; Wilson, Rob; Liepert, Beate; Cherubini, Paolo (2008). "On the 'Divergence Problem' in Northern Forests: A review of the tree-ring evidence and possible causes". Global and Planetary Change. 60 (3–4): 289–305. Bibcode:2008GPC....60..289D. doi:10.1016/j.gloplacha.2007.03.004. S2CID 3537918.
- Cook, E. R.; Anchukaitis, K. J.; Buckley, B. M.; D'Arrigo, R. D.; Jacoby, G. C.; Wright, W. E. (2010-04-23). "Asian Monsoon Failure and Megadrought During the Last Millennium". Science. 328 (5977): 486–489. Bibcode:2010Sci...328..486C. doi:10.1126/science.1185188. ISSN 0036-8075. PMID 20413498. S2CID 31874212.

== Awards and honors ==
- Fellow, American Geophysical Union (2019)
