= Phil Jones (climatologist) =

Climatologist

Phil Jones OBE
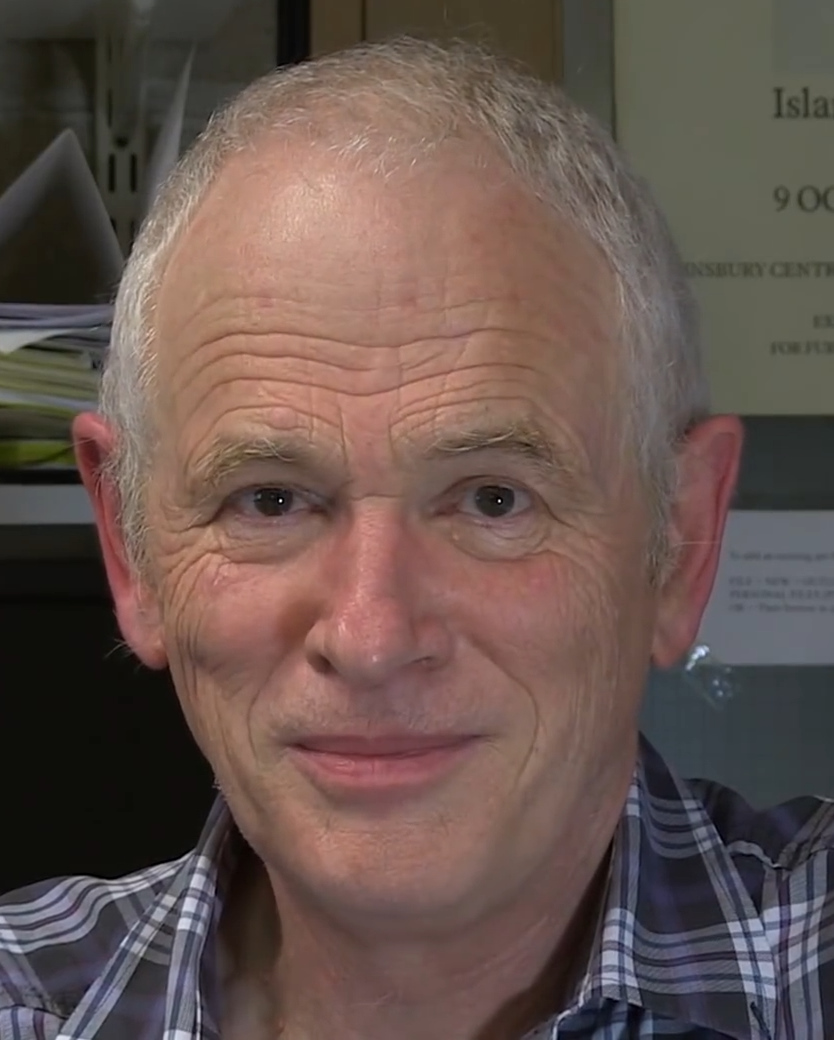
- Jones in 2015
- Born: 22 April 1952 (age 74); Redhill, Surrey
- Education: Lancaster University; University of Newcastle upon Tyne
- Awards: Hans Oeschger Medal (2002); AMS Fellow (2007); AGU Fellow (2009)
- Scientific career
- Fields: Climatology, Paleoclimatology
- Workplaces: University of East Anglia
- Thesis: A spatially distributed catchment model for flood forecasting and river regulation with particular reference to the River Tyne (1977)

Philip Douglas Jones (born 22 April 1952) is a former director of the Climatic Research Unit (CRU) and a professor in the School of Environmental Sciences at the University of East Anglia (UEA) from 1998, having begun his career at the unit in 1976. He retired from these positions at the end of 2016, and was replaced as CRU director by Tim Osborn. Jones then took up a position as a Professorial Fellow at the UEA from January 2017.

His research interests include instrumental climate change, palaeoclimatology, detection of climate change and the extension of riverflow records in the UK. He has also published papers on the temperature record of the past 1000 years.

He is known for maintaining a time series of the instrumental temperature record. This work was featured prominently in both the 2001 and 2007 IPCC reports, where he was a contributing author to Chapter 12, Detection of Climate Change and Attribution of Causes, of the Third Assessment Report and a Coordinating Lead Author of Chapter 3, Observations: Surface and Atmospheric Climate Change, of the AR4.

== Education ==
Jones obtained a B.A. in Environmental Sciences (1973) from Lancaster University, an M.Sc. in Engineering Hydrology (1974) and a Ph.D. in Hydrology (1977) from the Department of Civil Engineering at the University of Newcastle upon Tyne.

== Career ==
Jones has spent his entire career with the University of East Anglia's Climatic Research Unit (CRU). He began as a Senior Research Associate in 1976, advancing to Reader in 1994 and later to Professor in the School of Environmental Sciences in 1998. Jones served as Director of the CRU for 18 years, jointly with Jean Palutikof from 1998 to 2004 and then on his own until he retired at the end of 2016. Tim Osborn was appointed as his successor as the CRU Director.

He was on the editorial board of the International Journal of Climatology from 1989 to 1994 and has been on the editorial board of Climatic Change since 2004.

He has an h-index of 158 according to Google Scholar.

== Climate emails controversy ==
Jones temporarily stepped aside as Director of the CRU in November 2009 following a controversy over e-mails which were stolen and published by person(s) unknown. The House of Commons' Science and Technology Select Committee inquiry concluded that there was no case against Jones for him to answer, and said he should be reinstated in his post. He was reinstated in July 2010 with the newly created role of Director of Research, after a further review led by Sir Muir Russell found no fault with the "rigour and honesty as scientists" of Jones and his colleagues, though finding that the CRU scientists had not embraced the "spirit of openness" of the UK Freedom of Information Act. The university said the new position was not a demotion and would enable Jones to concentrate on research and "reduce his responsibilities for administration."

In October 2021 the BBC aired a television film, The Trick, on BBC One. The drama explored the controversy surrounding the unauthorized release and publication of documents and emails from Jones' department. Jones was portrayed by actor Jason Watkins.

== Awards and honors ==
- 1994 - Hugh Robert Mill Prize, Royal Meteorological Society
- 1998 - Norbert Gerbier-MUMM International Award, World Meteorological Organization
- 2001 - International Journal of Climatology Prize, Royal Meteorological Society
- 2002 - Hans Oeschger Medal, European Geosciences Union
- 2002 - ISI highly cited researcher, Institute for Scientific Information
- 2007 - Fellow, American Meteorological Society
- 2009 - Fellow, American Geophysical Union
- 2012 - Honorary Degree, University of Rovira I Virgili (Tarragona, Spain)
- 2016 - Honorary Degree, Stockholm University
- 2018 - Honorary Fellow, Royal Meteorological Society
- 2024 - Honorary Doctor of Science, Newcastle University
- 2025 - Appointed Officer of the Order of the British Empire (OBE) in the 2025 New Year Honours for services to Climatology.

== Selected publications ==
- Jones, P. D.; Mann, M. E. (2004). "Climate over past millennia" (PDF). Reviews of Geophysics. 42 (RG2002): 42. Bibcode:2004RvGeo..42.2002J. CiteSeerX 10.1.1.670.9877. doi:10.1029/2003RG000143. S2CID 2937939.
- Mann, Michael E.; Jones, Philip D. (2003). "Global Surface Temperatures over the Past Two Millennia" (PDF). Geophysical Research Letters. 30 (15): CLM 5–1~5–4. Bibcode:2003GeoRL..30.1820M. CiteSeerX 10.1.1.408.3837. doi:10.1029/2003GL017814. S2CID 5942198.
- Jones, P. D.; Moberg, A. (2003). "Hemispheric and Large-Scale Surface Air Temperature Variations: An Extensive Revision and an Update to 2001" (PDF). Journal of Climate. 16 (2): 206–223. Bibcode:2003JCli...16..206J. doi:10.1175/1520-0442(2003)016<0206:HALSSA>2.0.CO;2. S2CID 56362806.
- P. D. Jones; T. J. Osborn; K. R. Briffa (1997). "Estimating Sampling Errors in Large-Scale Temperature Averages". Journal of Climate. 10 (10): 2548–2568. Bibcode:1997JCli...10.2548J. doi:10.1175/1520-0442(1997)010<2548:ESEILS>2.0.CO;2.
