= Jean Palutikof =

Australian scientist

- Occupation: Climate scientist
- Employer: Griffith University
- Title: Professor

Jean P. Palutikof is a climate scientist and is founding director of the National Climate Change Adaptation Research Facility (NCCARF) at Griffith University in Queensland, Australia. She has held this position since 2008. Prior to this, Palutikof was based at the UK Met Office during which time she managed the production of the Intergovernmental Panel on Climate Change Fourth Assessment Report for Working Group II (Impacts, Adaptation and Vulnerability).

Palutikof is one the scholars of climate change adaptation and was lead author and review editor for several assessments of the Intergovernmental Panel on Climate Change. She was present in Oslo at the ceremony at which the organization received the Nobel Peace Prize.

== Career ==
Between 1974 and 1979 Palutikof worked as a lecturer in the Department of Geography at the University of Nairobi.

Between 1979 and 2004 Palutikof worked at the University of East Anglia in the United Kingdom in the School of Environmental Sciences and as Director of the Climatic Research Unit.

Palutikof was the Director of NCCARF at Griffith University from 2008 to present (as at 2023).

== Research ==
Palutikof's research focuses on the area of climate change - particularly the application of climatic data to economic and planning issues. Her area of speciality is extreme events and their impacts. She has collaborations with scientists across North America and Europe on the topic of constructing climate change scenarios which can be used in studies of climate impacts.

She has published over 200 pieces of research on the topic of anthropogenic climate change and climate variability.

Palutikof has conducted research on heat stress, under 'Area we ready for extreme heat', as part of her work as a Professor in Climate Change at Griffith University.

== Speaking engagements ==
In 2010, to launch Indiana University's William T. Patten Lecture Series Palutikof presented two public lectures. These were titled "The Role of International Treaties in Tackling Climate Change" and "Adaptation Strategies: A Poor Man's Solution?".

== Publications ==
Palutikof has numerous publications on climate adaptation, climate change, global climate models.

- Barnett, Jon, et al. “From Barriers to Limits to Climate Change Adaptation: Path Dependency and the Speed of Change.” Ecology and Society, vol. 20, no. 3, 2015. JSTOR.
- Beniston, M., Stephenson, D.B., Christensen, O.B. et al. Future extreme events in European climate: an exploration of regional climate model projections. Climatic Change 81 (Suppl 1), 71–95 (2007).
- Palutikof, J., Brabson, B., Lister, D., & Adcock, S. (1999). A review of methods to calculate extreme wind speeds. Meteorological Applications, 6(2), 119-132.

== Books ==
Palutikof has co-authored several books including the following:

- The Nature and Causes of climate Change: Assessing the long-term future
- Natural Disasters and Adaptation to Climate Change
- Climate Adaptation Futures

== Prizes ==
- 2007 - Nobel Peace Prize - Palutikof was Head of the Technical Support Unit of the Working Group II on the Inter-governmental Panel on Climate Change (IPCC).
