= Timothy Osborn =

Climatologist

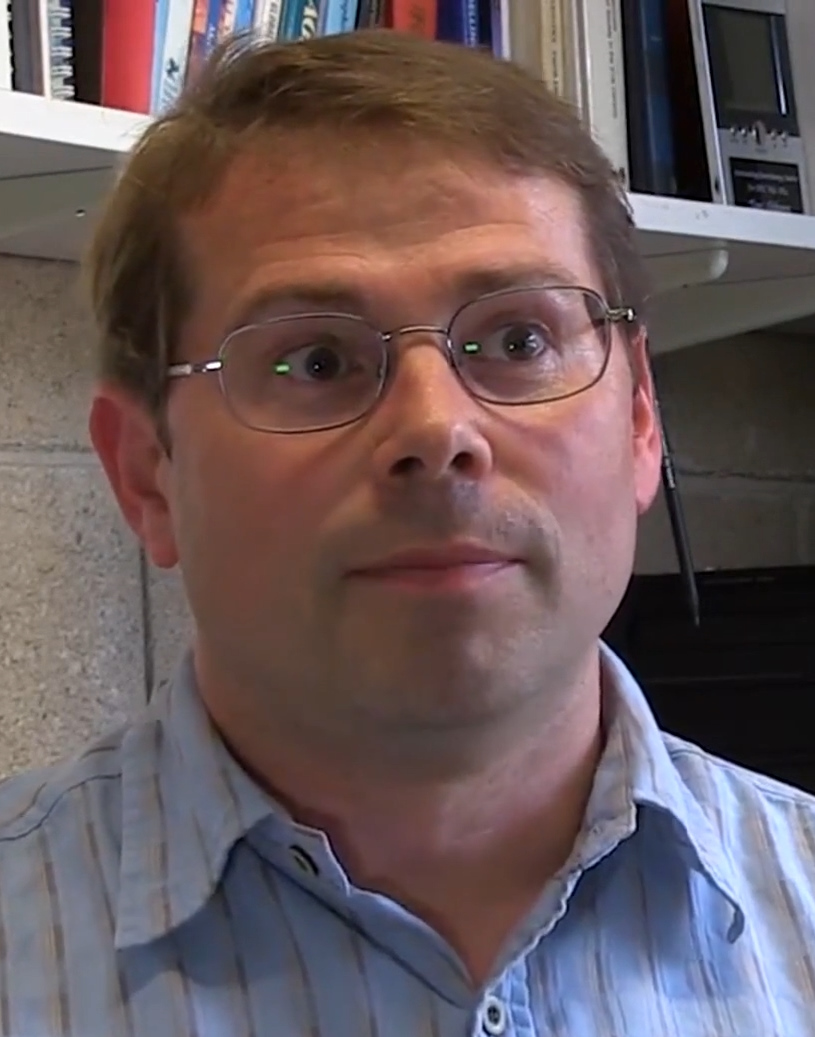
- Osborn in 2016
- Education: University of East Anglia
- Known for: Director, Climatic Research Unit at the University of East Anglia
- Awards: Hugh Robert Mill Prize (2002)
- Scientific career
- Fields: Climatology
- Workplaces: University of East Anglia
- Thesis: Internally-generated variability in some ocean models on decadal to millennial timescales (1995)
- Doctoral advisor: Tom Wigley
- Website: Professor Timothy Osborn

Timothy John Osborn is a climatologist and Professor of Climate Science at the University of East Anglia. In January 2017 he replaced Phil Jones as the Research Director of the Climatic Research Unit.

Osborn graduated with a first-class degree in Geophysical Sciences from the University of East Anglia in 1990, and a PhD from the School of Environmental Sciences in 1995. He was awarded the Hugh Robert Mill Prize by the Royal Meteorological Society in 2002. He was a Lead Author of the IPCC Fifth Assessment Report and a Review Editor of the Sixth Assessment Report.
