= Peter Liss =

British environmental scientist

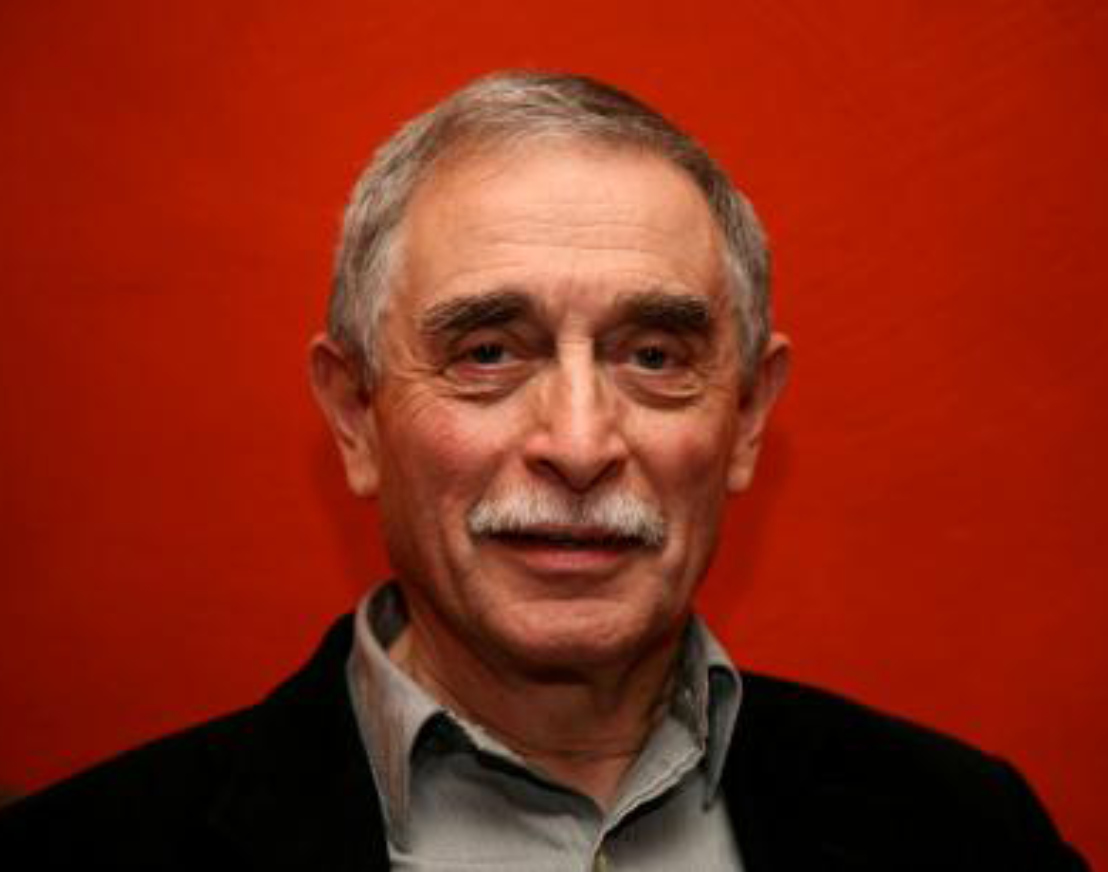
- Born: 27 October 1942 (age 83)
- Education: University College, Durham; University of Wales
- Awards: FRS (2008)
- Scientific career
- Fields: Environmental Science
- Workplaces: University of East Anglia

Peter Simon Liss CBE FRS (born 27 October 1942) is a British environmental scientist, and professorial fellow, at the University of East Anglia.

== Background ==
Liss studied at Durham University, earning a BSc. He then completed a PhD at the University of Wales.

== Career ==
His research group is a part of the Laboratory for Global Marine and Atmospheric Chemistry (LGMAC). He is a member of the Solar Radiation Working Group.

He was awarded the Challenger Society Medal in 2000 and the John Jeyes Medal of the Royal Society of Chemistry in 2003/04.
