= Journal of Climate =

- Discipline: Climatology
- Language: English

Publication details
- Former names: Journal of Climate and Applied Meteorology
- History: 1988–present
- Publisher: American Meteorological Society (United States)
- Frequency: Biweekly
- Open access: Delayed, 1 year
- Impact factor: 5.380 (2021)

Standard abbreviations
- ISO 4: J. Clim.

Indexing
- ISSN: 0894-8755 (print); 1520-0442 (web)

Links
- Journal homepage; Online access

The Journal of Climate is a biweekly peer-reviewed scientific journal published semi-monthly by the American Meteorological Society. It covers research that advances basic understanding of the dynamics and physics of the climate system on large spatial scales, including variability of the atmosphere, oceans, land surface, and cryosphere; past, present, and projected future changes in the climate system; and climate simulation and prediction.

== See also ==
- List of scientific journals in earth and atmospheric sciences
