= Climatic Research Unit =

UK Climate Change research body

Coordinates: 52.6218°N 1.2385°E

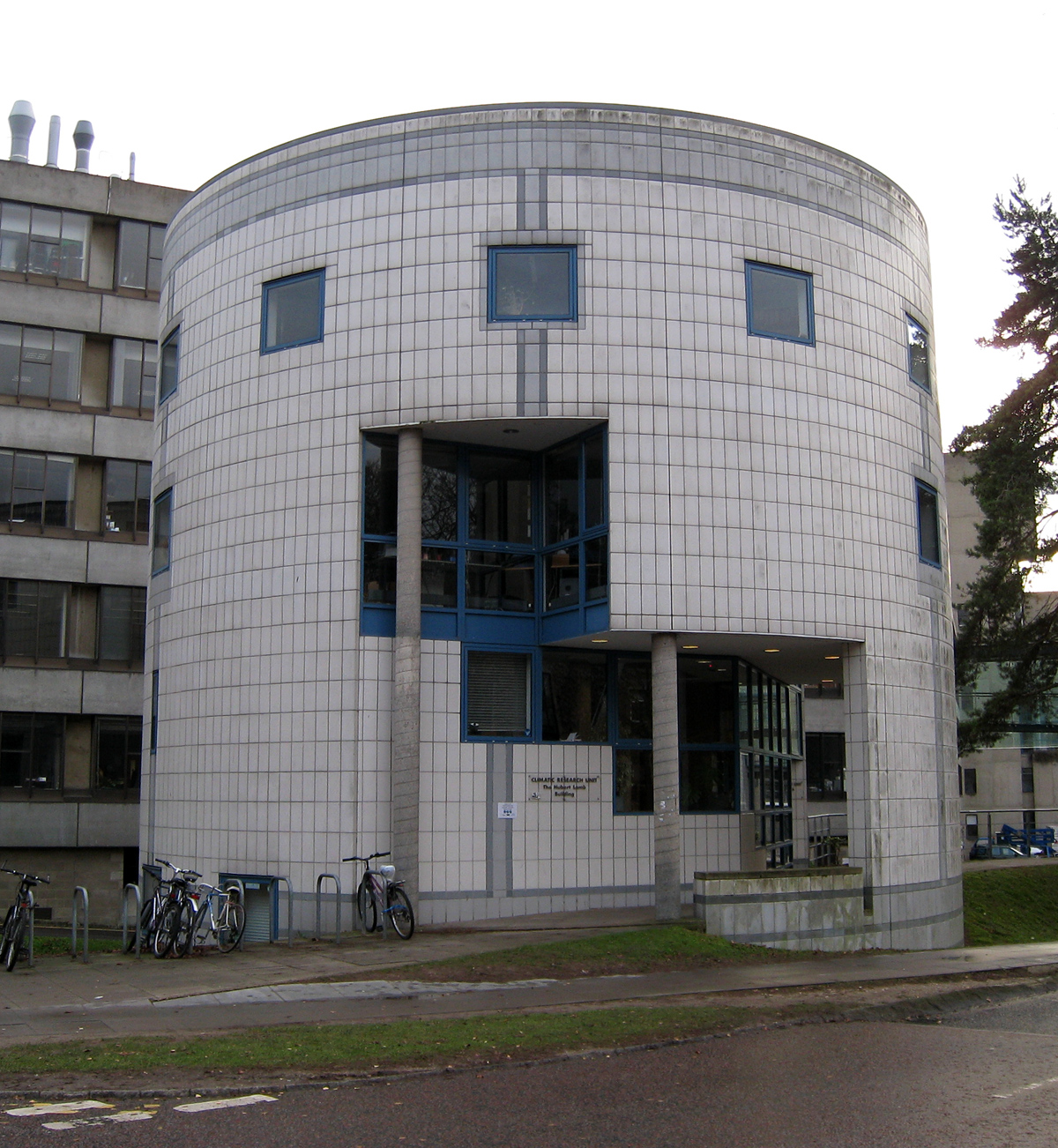
The Hubert Lamb Building, University of East Anglia, where the Climatic Research Unit is based

The Climatic Research Unit (CRU) is a component of the University of East Anglia and is one of the leading institutions concerned with the study of natural and anthropogenic climate change.

With a staff of some thirty research scientists and students, the CRU has contributed to the development of a number of the data sets widely used in climate research, including one of the global temperature records used to monitor the state of the climate system, as well as statistical software packages and climate models.

== History ==
The CRU was founded in 1972 as part of the university's School of Environmental sciences. The establishment of the Unit owed much to the support of Sir Graham Sutton, a former Director-General of the Meteorological Office, Lord Solly Zuckerman, an adviser to the University, and Professors Keith Clayton and Brian Funnel, Deans of the School of Environmental Sciences in 1971 and 1972. Initial sponsors included British Petroleum, the Nuffield Foundation and Royal Dutch Shell. The Rockefeller Foundation was another early benefactor, and the Wolfson Foundation gave the Unit its current building in 1986. Since the second half of the 1970s the Unit has also received funding through a series of contracts with the United States Department of Energy to support the work of those involved in climate reconstruction and analysis of the effects on climate of greenhouse gas emissions. The UK Government (Margaret Thatcher) became a strong supporter of climate research in the mid-1980s.

The first director of the unit was Professor Hubert Lamb, who had previously led research into climatic variation at the Met Office. He was then known as the "ice man" for his prediction of global cooling and a coming ice age but, following the UK's exceptionally hot summer of 1976, he switched to predicting a more imminent global warming. The possibility of major weather changes and flooding attracted attention to the unit and sponsorship by major insurance companies wanting to mitigate their potential losses. Prior to the Unit's establishment, it had widely been believed by the meteorological establishment that the climate was essentially constant and unvarying. Lamb and others in the climatological community had for years argued that the climate system was in fact highly variable on timescales of decades to centuries and longer. The establishment of the CRU enabled Lamb and his colleagues to focus on this issue and eventually to win the argument decisively.

Hubert Lamb retired in 1978. His successors were Tom Wigley (1978–1993), Trevor Davies (1993–1998), Jean Palutikof and Phil Jones (jointly 1998–2004), Phil Jones (2004–2016), and Tim Osborn (from January 2017); Peter Liss was acting director during investigations between December 2009 and July 2010. In 1984, the unit moved to a new cylindrical building designed by Rick Mather. In 2006, this was named the Hubert Lamb Building in honour of the first director.

== Activities ==
At the time of its establishment the CRU set out four key aims, which still remain valid:

- To establish firmer knowledge of the history of climate in the recent and distant past.
- To monitor and report on current climatic developments on a global scale.
- To identify the processes (natural and man-made) at work in climatic fluctuations and the characteristic timescales of their evolution.
- To investigate the possibilities of making advisory statements about future trends of weather and climate from a season to many years ahead, based on acceptable scientific methods and in a form likely to be useful for long-term planning purposes.

CRU produces a range of climate datasets, covering temperature, precipitation, pressure and circulation, both global and regional. One of the CRU's most significant products is the CRUTEM global dataset of land near-surface temperature anomalies on a 5° by 5° grid-box basis, which is compiled in conjunction with the Hadley Centre for Climate Prediction and Research and its sea-surface temperature dataset to produce the HadCRUT temperature record. First compiled in the early 1980s, the record documents global temperature fluctuations since the 1850s. The CRU compiles the land component of the record and the Hadley Centre provides the marine component. The merged record is used by the Intergovernmental Panel on Climate Change in all its publications.

Other products include the CRU-TS high-resolution monthly gridded land surface dataset of multiple variables including precipitation, vapour pressure, cloud cover, and temperature. This dataset is used to monitor drought conditions, for example.

CRU is also involved in a study of Eurasian climate over the last 10,000 years based upon tree ring data and a study of European climate in the last 200 years based upon temperature records. It is a participant in MEDALUS – the Mediterranean Desertification and Land Use project. The custodians of the raw data are the National Meteorological Organisations that originated the data; CRU retains most but not all of the raw data, which continues to be held by the originating services.

It published a quarterly journal, Climate Monitor. This ceased publication in 1998, being replaced by an online version, Climate Monitor Online.

=== Release of raw meteorological data ===
The CRU collates data from many sources around the world. In August 2009 its director, Phil Jones, told the science journal Nature that he was working to make the data publicly available with the agreement of its owners but this was expected to take some months, and objections were anticipated from National Meteorological Organisations that made money from selling the data. It was not free to share that data without the permission of its owners because of confidentiality agreements, including with institutions in Spain, Germany, Bahrain and Norway, that restricted the data to academic use. In some cases, the agreements were made orally, and some of the written agreements had been lost during a move. Despite this, the CRU was the focus of numerous requests under the Freedom of Information Act for data used by the unit's scientists. Nature reported that in the course of five days in July 2009 the CRU had been "inundated" with 58 FOI requests from Stephen McIntyre and people affiliated with his Climate Audit blog requesting access to raw climate data or information about their use.

In early 2011 a large amount of raw weather station data had been released by the Met Office and the US Global Historical Climatology Network, but around two-thirds of the data owners did not respond to the CRU requests for agreement, and both Poland and Trinidad and Tobago declined. Two FOIA requests for data shared with another researcher were refused by the university, and the requestors appealed this to the Information Commissioner's Office (ICO). In its decision released on 23 June 2011, the ICO required CRU to release the remaining raw data irrespective of the wishes of the meteorological organisations which owned the data. This decision included data from Trinidad and Tobago but did not cover Poland. The raw data release was completed by 27 July 2011.

== CRU email controversy ==
In November 2009, hackers gained access to a server used by the CRU and stole a large quantity of data, anonymously posting online more than 1,000 emails and more than 2,000 other documents. Some climate change deniers including bloggers falsely asserted that a number of the leaked e-mails contain evidence supporting their global warming conspiracy theory that scientists had allegedly conspired to manipulate data and to keep scientists who have contrary views out of peer-review literature. This controversy was dubbed "Climategate".

A series of independent public investigations of the allegations found no evidence of fraud or scientific misconduct. The Muir Russell report exonerated the scientists, but found "a consistent pattern of failing to display the proper degree of openness, both on the part of CRU scientists and on the part of the UEA". The scientific consensus that global warming is occurring as a result of human activity remained unchanged.

In 2011, a new analysis of temperature data by the independent Berkeley Earth Surface Temperature group, many of whom had stated publicly that they thought it was possible that the CRU had manipulated data, concluded that "these studies were done carefully and that potential biases identified by climate change sceptics did not seriously affect their conclusions".

== See also ==
- Climate change in the United Kingdom
- Deutscher Wetterdienst (German weather service)
- NASA Goddard Institute for Space Studies
- NCAR Community Climate System Model
- NOAA
- Potsdam Institute for Climate Impact Research (PIK)
