= The Hockey Stick and the Climate Wars =

2012 book by Michael E. Mann

- Author: Michael E. Mann
- Publisher: Columbia University Press
- Publication date: 2012
- Pages: 395
- ISBN: 978-0-231-15254-9
- Dewey Decimal: 577.22
- LC Class: QC903 .M36 2012

The Hockey Stick and the Climate Wars: Dispatches from the Front Lines is a 2012 book about climate change by the American climatologist and geophysicist Michael E. Mann. In the book Mann describes how he became a researcher investigating the temperature record of the past 1000 years and was lead author, with Raymond S. Bradley and Malcolm K. Hughes, on the 1999 reconstruction that was the first to be dubbed the hockey stick graph. He concisely explains the basics of climate science including statistical methodology dealing with paleoclimate proxy data, and examines the tactics which opponents of action on climate change use to distort the science and attack the reputations of climate scientists. The book describes both this controversy and the broader context of skepticism in science and contrarians rejecting evidence of human influence on climate.

The book was picked by Physics Today books editor Jermey Matthews as one of the five top books of the 49 they had reviewed in 2012.

== Reviews ==
Publishers Weekly described the book as a "meticulous and engaging brief on climate change research and the political backlash to legitimate scientific work", with a tendency to over-technical language offset by "charming personal anecdotes from his life and work". Kirkus Reviews called it "an important and disturbing account" of attempts to spread doubt about climate science, and said "This blistering indictment of corporate-funded chicanery demands a wide audience."

For Simon Lewis, reviewing the book for Nature, the book became "riveting" when it came to the research which produced the "hockey stick" graphs, following which "Mann's shocking first-hand testimony of the repeated attempts to discredit him and his work gives his book power." While basically agreeing with Mann, Lewis was uncomfortable with seeing the dispute as a binary "climate war", preferring the less polarised metaphor of a "street fight". In the Geoscientist magazine of the Geological Society of London, Colin Summerhayes described Mann as "a pioneer in analysing proxy records of climate change covering the past 1,000 years" whose early work had attracted vituperative attacks but had been supported by subsequent studies, and would "heartily recommend this book for an unusually clear view of the action on the front line of climate science".

Rudy M. Baum in the magazine of the American Chemical Society said it was "one of the most useful books yet in explaining climate science", particularly paleoclimatology, as well as examining "the tactics used by climate-change deniers to distort the science of climate change and smear the reputations of climate scientists." Helpful explanations of concepts were backed by extensive citations and notes, and while casual readers would not turn to these pages, the notes included some important insights. Michael Marshall, environment reporter for New Scientist, commented that although other studies showed the "hockey stick" graph was essentially correct, it came under persistent attack over statistical issues that the book explains in detail, difficult reading material which "will be invaluable for anyone confused by the many claims and counterclaims found online." It was "an admirable attempt to tell the behind-the-scenes story of one of today's most vicious scientific battles."

Anne Jolis of The Wall Street Journal said that for what she called "anti-carbon crusaders" the "hockey stick" graph demonstrates the danger "that man poses to the planet", but for "global-warming skeptics, though, the graph and the name are prime examples of the overblown claims and sloppy science behind much of climatology." She said the book was largely "score-settling with anyone who has ever doubted his integrity or work: free-market think tanks, industrialists, 'scientists for hire,' 'the corruptive influence of industry,' the 'uninformed' media and public. So, a long list", and describes Mann as a "scientist-turned-climate-warrior."
