= Attorney General of Virginia's climate science investigation =

Controversy in Virginia

The Attorney General of Virginia's climate science investigation was a civil investigative demand initiated in April 2010 by Virginia Attorney General Ken Cuccinelli, who rejects the scientific consensus on climate change, for a wide range of records held by the University of Virginia related to five grant applications for research work by a leading climate scientist Michael E. Mann, who was an assistant professor at the university from 1999 to 2005. The demand was issued under the Virginia Fraud Against Taxpayers Act in connection with claims by Cuccinnelli that Mann had possibly violated state fraud laws in relation to five research grants, by allegedly manipulating data. No evidence of wrongdoing was presented to support the claim. Mann's earlier work had been targeted by climate change deniers attacking the hockey stick graph, and allegations against him were renewed in late 2009 in the Climatic Research Unit email controversy but found to be groundless in a series of investigations.

Widespread concerns were raised by University of Virginia's faculty and numerous scientists and science organizations that Cuccinelli's actions posed a threat to academic freedom, and would have a chilling effect on research in the state. The university filed a court petition and the judge dismissed Cuccinelli's demand on the grounds that no justification had been shown for the investigation. Cuccinelli tried to re-open his case by issuing a revised subpoena, and appealed the case to the Virginia Supreme Court. The case was defended by the university, and the court ruled that Cuccinelli did not have the authority to make these demands. The outcome was seen as a victory for academic freedom.

== Background ==
While an adjunct assistant professor at the University of Massachusetts Amherst, Michael E. Mann co-authored with Raymond S. Bradley and Malcolm K. Hughes two reconstructions of the past temperatures in the northern hemisphere: MBH98 and MBH99. The latter extended back 1,000 years and was nicknamed the "hockey stick graph". In 1999 Mann joined the University of Virginia as an assistant professor. A version of MBH99 featured prominently in the 2001 IPCC Third Assessment Report, and attacks on the graph by those opposing action on global warming became politically prominent. The validity of the research was confirmed by the National Academy of Sciences. In 2005 Mann moved on to a position as an associate professor at Pennsylvania State University. The Climatic Research Unit email controversy which began in November 2009 brought renewed scrutiny, and allegations of scientific malpractice. An investigation by Pennsylvania State University determined on 3 February 2010 that there was no evidence of misconduct by Mann.

In January 2010, Ken Cuccinelli took office as Virginia's elected Attorney General. He is a conservative Republican party politician who alleges that the evidence of global warming has been skewed by scientists. The following month he filed suit seeking to overturn a finding of the United States Environmental Protection Agency that greenhouse gases endanger public health and welfare.

== Civil Investigative Demand ==
Cuccinelli's office served a formal Civil Investigative Demand (CID) on the University of Virginia on 23 April 2010, requiring the university to produce information and documentary materials by 27 May 2010. The civil investigative demand was equivalent to a subpoena but did not require the Attorney General to file a lawsuit or to obtain the intervention or permission of a court so that he could make the demand.

The CID referred to an investigation by the Attorney General into "possible violations" by Mann of the Virginia Fraud Against Taxpayers Act (FATA). Information required related to Mann having sought grants funded by the Commonwealth of Virginia, and any data or communications Mann had made in connection with five named grants for scientific research. The university was instructed to produce documents dating from January 1999 to the present, including all emailed or written correspondence from, to or relating to Mann and 39 named climate scientists as well as research assistants, secretaries and administrative staff, anything connected with applications for the grants or payment of the grants, and all "documents, drafts, things or data" generated in carrying out the grant assisted research. They also required all "computer algorithms, programs, source code or the like" created or edited by Mann and stored by the university. Where documents were no longer held by the university, the CID required details of who had destroyed or removed them, and their authority for doing so.

On May 4 Cuccinelli described the request as part of an "open inquiry" into whether Mann had made "knowing inconsistencies" when applying for research funding. Cuccinelli said, "In light of the Climategate e-mails, there does seem to at least be an argument to be made that a course was undertaken by some of the individuals involved, including potentially Michael Mann, where they were steering a course to reach a conclusion". He added, "Our act, frankly, just requires honesty." The following day he said, "We aren't targeting scientific conclusions. That's not the issue. It's the expenditure of taxpayer dollars."

The university responded on 5 May with a position statement which noted that four of the five named research grants were from federal organisations outside Virginia. The CID referred to FATA provisions on financial fraud, but Cuccinelli's comments in The Washington Post and the unusual nature of the CID "strongly suggest that the investigation is motivated primarily by differences of opinion regarding the scientific basis for current understanding of climate change." They considered his actions inappropriate in scientific inquiry; "His action and the potential threat of legal prosecution of scientific endeavor that has satisfied peer-review standards send a chilling message to scientists engaged in basic research involving Earth’s climate and indeed to scholars in any discipline. Such actions directly threaten academic freedom and, thus, our ability to generate the knowledge upon which informed public policy relies."

== Initial public reaction ==
Academics and scientists said that Cuccinelli's demand threatened academic freedom. Mann said that he believed that Cuccinelli was "simply trying to smear me as part of a larger campaign to discredit my science". Nineteen professors at Virginia's Old Dominion University issued a statement saying that Cuccinelli's actions "echo some of the worst offenses of the McCarthy era", alluding to the anti-Communist investigations of Senator Joseph McCarthy in the 1950s. They demanded that he "cease and desist from this and further 'witch hunts' driven by partisan political agendas that waste valuable state resources in a difficult economy." U.Va.'s Faculty Senate issued a statement criticizing the investigation as being politically motivated and "an inappropriate way to engage with the process of scientific inquiry" which "directly threaten[s] academic freedom" by "send[ing] a chilling message to scientists engaged in basic research involving Earth's climate and indeed to scholars in any discipline."

More than 800 state university and college faculty members signed a petition organized by the Union of Concerned Scientists, which said in a statement: "Much of Virginia's scientific and academic community is appalled that their attorney general has launched such a blatantly political investigation." The American Civil Liberties Union of Virginia and the American Association of University Professors also criticized Cuccinelli's actions, commenting in a joint letter that "it is hard to conceive of the Attorney General's request ... as anything but a "fishing expedition" aimed at discrediting Dr. Mann's conclusions, rather than pursuing any reasonable suspicions of malfeasance." A statement by the directors of the American Association for the Advancement of Science said that "scientists should not be subjected to fraud investigations simply for providing scientific results that may be controversial or inconvenient" and that investigations such as those Cuccinelli has initiated against Mann "could have a long-lasting and chilling effect on a broad spectrum of research fields that are critical to a range of national interests from public health to national security to the environment."

The science journal Nature published an editorial describing the investigation as "an ideologically motivated inquisition that harasses and intimidates climate scientists". Chip Knappenberger, assistant to global warming denier Patrick Michaels, said just as he "didn't like it when the politicians came after Pat Michaels," he "[doesn't] like it that the politicians are coming after Mike Mann." The Washington Post said in an editorial that Cuccinelli had "declared war on the freedom of academic inquiry" and that he had demonstrated "a dangerous disregard for scientific method and academic freedom." In a subsequent editorial the newspaper applauded U.Va's decision to resist the demand and highlighted the potential cost of the precedent being set by Cuccinelli, noting that "if researchers at state institutions are unwilling to stick their necks out in case a state official dislikes their findings, scientific progress at the commonwealth's universities will screech to a halt, talented faculty will leave, and the best and brightest students will go elsewhere."

== Litigation involving original Civil Investigative Demand ==
Many scientists urged the university to resist. On 27 May U.Va. filed a petition with Albemarle County Circuit Court asking a judge to dismiss Cuccinelli's demand. The university argued that Cuccinelli had issued a vague, non-specific demand that exceeded his statutory authority: "Investigating the merits of a university researcher's methodology, results and conclusions (on climate change or any topic) goes far beyond the Attorney General's limited statutory power". The petition connected Cuccinelli's actions with his ongoing litigation about federal environmental policy and regulation. It argued in a subsequent brief that the demand was "fundamentally legally flawed".

Cuccinelli filed a brief in response on 11 June asserting that he had a right to demand climate change records, arguing that "neither academic freedom nor the First Amendment have ever been held to immunize a person, whether an academic or not, from civil or criminal actions for fraud, let alone immunized them from an otherwise authorized investigation." The Union of Concerned Scientists noted that the brief based its arguments on emails from the Climatic Research Unit email controversy, but said it misrepresented emails and took them out of context. Shortly afterwards, Penn State university Investigatory Inquiry announced that it had unanimously "determined that there is no substance" to the allegations against Mann.

A follow-up brief filed on 13 July again asserted Cuccinelli's authority and questioned Mann's scientific findings, asserting that Mann and other scientists had manipulated scientific conclusions to produce results that could be used to support the regulation of carbon dioxide. The Union of Concerned Scientists described it as making basic errors based on claims taken out of context.

U.Va. responded by questioning Cuccinelli's motives, stating that his demand was "aimed squarely at Dr. Mann's scientific conclusions" and that more than a third of the attorney general's brief "is devoted to challenging and criticizing the research and conclusions of Dr. Mann and his co-authors." The University argued that given the importance of protecting academic freedom the court should not permit the attorney general to exceed his statutory power, and that "such a potentially invasive investigative tool should not be permitted to be used to target academics merely because the Attorney General disputes the legitimacy of their research and conclusions." It noted that four of the grants queried by Cuccinelli were received from the federal government and were therefore not covered by the Virginia Fraud Against Taxpayers Act, while the fifth was awarded before the statute was enacted in 2003. U.Va. argued that much of the information demanded by Cuccinelli had nothing to do with any of the five grants and was "not even remotely tailored to an investigation of a potential [fraud statute] investigation." The presiding judge, Cheryl V. Higgins, agreed to stay Cuccinelli's demand pending further oral hearings due to take place in late August.

On August 20, 2010, Albemarle Circuit Court Judge Paul Peatross heard argument on when Cuccinelli should get the requested data, including emails between Mann and his research assistants, secretaries and 39 other scientists across the country. In the court's ruling issued on August 30, 2010, the judge concluded that the university was a proper subject for a Civil Investigative Demand which could investigate "grants made with Commonwealth of Virginia funds to professors such as Dr. Mann", but not the federal grants. However, the demands did not show "reason to believe" that the university held relevant material, or meet the statute requirements to state "the nature of the conduct" so that "any reasonable person could glean what Dr. Mann did to violate the statute". The court completely rejected the demands, but left it open for the "Commonwealth to proceed according to the law". At this point, Cuccinelli could either rewrite the civil investigative demand or appeal the decision.

Mann called the ruling a victory "for all scientists who live in fear that they may be subject to a politically-motivated witch hunt when their research findings prove inconvenient to powerful vested interests."

== Second Civil Investigative Demand ==
On September 29, 2010, Cuccinelli filed a revised CID in order to address some of the shortcomings identified in the August 30 ruling. The main changes were narrowing the case to the only one of the five original grants which was not a federal grant and stating the specific allegation of fraud: he referred to the Mann, Bradley and Hughes 1998 and 1998 "hockey stick" hemispheric climate reconstructions (MBH98 and MBH99), and said "Specifically, but without limitation, some of the conclusions of the papers demonstrate a complete lack of rigor regarding the statistical analysis of the alleged data, meaning that the result reported lacked statistical significance without a specific statement to that effect." Mann noted that the grant concerned was for research into the interaction between the atmosphere and vegetation in the African savannah, and did not relate to climate reconstructions. The University of Virginia announced that it would fight the request, and stated that resisting the Attorney General's demands had already cost it $350,000 in legal fees, paid from private funds.

On October 20, 2010, the University of Virginia filed papers requesting that Cuccinelli’s latest demand be “set aside” as well. UVa’s lawyers pointed out that Cuccinelli’s latest CID recites verbatim the first 15 pages of the attorney general’s brief in opposition to UVa’s petition to dismiss the previous CIDs. They stated that the text had already been considered by the court and “found deficient.”

== Virginia Supreme Court Ruling ==
In March, 2011, the Supreme Court of Virginia decided to hear Cuccinelli's appeal. Both sides were expected to file legal briefs outlining their cases in the spring, and a hearing was to be held at some point after those documents were received.

On 2 March 2012 the Supreme Court ruled that Cuccinelli as Attorney General had no legal authority to demand the records from the university. Mann expressed pleasure at the outcome, but stated that "It's sad that so much money and resources had to be wasted on Cuccinelli's witch hunt against me and the University of Virginia, when it could have been invested, for example, in measures to protect Virginia's coastline from the damaging effects of sea-level rise it is already seeing." The Union of Concerned Scientists applauded the reconfirmation that the demands lacked legal standing, and said that "Academic institutions have the responsibility to protect their faculty's ability to discover new things about our world without fearing harassment. Nobody should expect the rough drafts of their work to be subject to the same level of scrutiny as their published research." The Attorney General's office put out a statement that "From the beginning, we have said that we were simply trying to review documents that are unquestionably state property to determine whether or not fraud had been committed. Today, the court effectively held that state agencies do not have to provide state-owned property to state investigators looking into potential fraud involving government funds."
