= North Report =

The North Report was a 2006 report evaluating reconstructions of the temperature record of the past two millennia, providing an overview of the state of the science and the implications for understanding of global warming. It was produced by a National Research Council committee, chaired by Gerald North, at the request of Representative Sherwood Boehlert as chairman of the U.S. House of Representatives Committee on Science.

These reconstructions had been dubbed "hockey stick graphs" after the 1999 reconstruction by Mann, Bradley and Hughes (MBH99), which used the methodology of their 1998 reconstruction covering 600 years (MBH98). A graph based on MBH99 was featured prominently in the 2001 IPCC Third Assessment Report (TAR), and became a focus of the global warming controversy over the 1997 Kyoto Protocol. It was disputed by various contrarians, and in the politicisation of this "hockey stick controversy" the New York Times of 14 February 2005 hailed a paper by businessman Stephen McIntyre and economist Ross McKitrick (MM05) as undermining the scientific consensus behind the Kyoto agreement. On 23 June 2005, Rep. Joe Barton, chairman of the House Committee on Energy and Commerce, with Ed Whitfield, Chairman of the Subcommittee on Oversight and Investigations, wrote joint letters referring to issues raised by the Wall Street Journal article, and demanding that Mann, Bradley and Hughes provide full records on their data and methods, finances and careers, information about grants provided to the institutions they had worked for, and the exact computer codes used to generate their results. Boehlert said this was a "misguided and illegitimate investigation" into something that should properly be under the jurisdiction of the Science Committee, and in November 2005 after Barton dismissed the offer of an independent investigation organised by the U.S. National Academy of Sciences, Boehlert requested the review, which became the North Report.

The North Report went through a rigorous review process, and was published on 22 June 2006. It concluded "with a high level of confidence that global mean surface temperature was higher during the last few decades of the 20th century than during any comparable period during the preceding four centuries", justified by consistent evidence from a wide variety of geographically diverse proxies, but "Less confidence can be placed in large-scale surface temperature reconstructions for the period from 900 to 1600". It broadly agreed with the basic findings of the original MBH studies, which subsequently been supported by other reconstructions and proxy records, while emphasising uncertainties over earlier periods. The principal component analysis methodology that McIntyre and McKitrick had contested had a small tendency to bias results so was not recommended—but it had little influence on the final reconstructions, and other methods produced similar results.

== Outline ==
At the request of the U.S. Congress, initiated by Representative Sherwood Boehlert as chairman of the U.S. House of Representatives Committee on Science, a special "Committee on Surface Temperature Reconstructions for the Past 2,000 Years" was assembled by the National Research Council to quickly prepare a concise report. The NRC Committee, chaired by Gerald North, consisted of 12 scientists and statisticians from different disciplines. Its task was "to summarize current scientific information on the temperature record for the past two millennia, describe the main areas of uncertainty and how significant they are, describe the principal methodologies used and any problems with these approaches, and explain how central is the debate over the paleoclimate temperature record to the state of scientific knowledge on global climate change." The NRC report went through a rigorous review process involving 15 independent experts. The report provided a summary and an overview, followed by 11 technical chapters covering the instrumental and proxy records, statistical procedures, paleoclimate models, and the synthesis of large scale temperature reconstructions with an assessment of the "strengths, limitations, and prospects for improvement" in techniques used.

=== Publication and press conference ===
The NRC committee's report (the North report) was published on 22 June 2006. Committee member John Michael Wallace said that "Our conclusion is that this recent period of warming is likely the warmest in the last millennium", and added that "This doesn't change the scientific landscape in terms of the greenhouse warming debate". At a press conference, held on the same day, clarifications were given by three members of the NRC committee science panel: Gerald North, the statistician Peter Bloomfield and ice sheet/borehole specialist Kurt M. Cuffey.

==== NRC report summary ====
In its summary, the NRC committee noted the development of large-scale surface temperature reconstructions, especially MBH98 and MBH99, and highlighted six recent reconstructions: Huang, Pollack & Shen 2000, Mann & Jones 2003, Hegerl et al. 2006, Oerlemans 2005, Moberg et al. 2005 and Esper, Cook & Schweingruber 2002. Its main findings were; 20th century instrumentally measured warming showed in observational evidence, and can be simulated with climate models, large-scale surface temperature reconstructions "yield a generally consistent picture of temperature trends during the preceding millennium", including the Medieval Warm Period and the Little Ice Age, "but the exact timing and duration of warm periods may have varied from region to region, and the magnitude and geographic extent of the warmth are uncertain." It concluded "with a high level of confidence that global mean surface temperature was higher during the last few decades of the 20th century than during any comparable period during the preceding four centuries", justified by consistent evidence from a wide variety of geographically diverse proxies, but "Less confidence can be placed in large-scale surface temperature reconstructions for the period from 900 to 1600", and very little confidence could be assigned to hemispheric or global mean surface temperature estimates before about 900.

The NRC committee stated that "The basic conclusion of Mann et al. (1998, 1999) was that the late 20th century warmth in the Northern Hemisphere was unprecedented during at least the last 1,000 years. This conclusion has subsequently been supported by an array of evidence that includes both additional large-scale surface temperature reconstructions and pronounced changes in a variety of local proxy indicators". It said "Based on the analyses presented in the original papers by Mann et al. and this newer supporting evidence, the committee finds it plausible that the Northern Hemisphere was warmer during the last few decades of the 20th century than during any comparable period over the preceding millennium", though there were substantial uncertainties before about 1600. It added that "Even less confidence can be placed in the original conclusions by Mann et al. (1999) that 'the 1990s are likely the warmest decade, and 1998 the warmest year, in at least a millennium' because the uncertainties inherent in temperature reconstructions for individual years and decades are larger than those for longer time periods and because not all of the available proxies record temperature information on such short timescales." It noted that "Surface temperature reconstructions for periods prior to the industrial era are only one of multiple lines of evidence supporting the conclusion that climatic warming is occurring in response to human activities, and they are not the primary evidence."

At the press conference, North said of the MBH papers that "we do roughly agree with the substance of their findings. There is a small disagreement over exactly how sure we are." All three from the NRC committee panel said it was probable, though not certain, that current warming exceeded any previous peak in the last thousand years. When asked if they could quantify "less confidence" and "plausible", Bloomfield explained that their wording reflected the panel's scientific judgements rather than well defined statistical procedures, and "When we speak of 'less confidence' we're more into a level of sort of 2 to 1 odds, which IPCC, they interpreted 'likely' as that level, roughly 2 to 1 odds or better."

==== MBH99 and controversy ====
The NRC report said that the MBH99 study had attracted considerable attention because of its conclusion that recent decades were the warmest in the northern hemisphere in 1000 years, and "Controversy arose because many people interpreted this result as definitive evidence of anthropogenic causes of recent climate change, while others criticized the methodologies and data that were used." Chapter 11 of the report described MBH98 as the "first systematic, statistically based synthesis of multiple climate proxies", and noted that the MBH reconstructions "were the first to include explicit statistical error bars". The report's overview section said that, despite the wide error bars, the hockey stick graph "was misinterpreted by some as indicating the existence of one 'definitive' reconstruction with small century-to-century variability prior to the mid-19th century".

When questioned about who had said MBH99 was definitive when the paper itself emphasised the uncertainties, North said his opinion was that, "The community probably took the results to be more definitive than Mann and colleagues originally intended." Kurt Cuffey said the context was that the MBH work "...was really the first of its kind," and had generated debate in the normal process of science where ideas are put forward then challenged over time. The IPCC 2001 report had been careful to give the two-year-old paper's conclusion fairly low confidence as "likely" at 2 to 1 odds, but use of the graph as a visual had created a misleading impression that this research was more resolved. The graph had been used as a visual in several places, including the IPCC summary for policymakers.

==== MBH statistical methods ====
Various criticisms of the MBH statistical methods were discussed in Chapter 11, in the context of more recent research that explored ways to address these problems, and showed greater amplitude of temperature variations over 1000 to 2000 years. Recent papers cited included Wahl & Ammann 2007. On McIntyre and McKitrick's criticism of principal component analysis as tending to bias the shape of the reconstructions, it found that "In practice, this method, though not recommended, does not appear to unduly influence reconstructions of hemispheric mean temperature", and reconstructions using other methods were qualitatively similar. Some of the criticisms of validation techniques were more valid than others, these issues and the effect on robustness of the choice of proxies contributed to the committee's view of increased uncertainties. They called for further research into methods and a search for more proxies for earlier periods.

At the press conference the three NRC panellists said they found no evidence supporting the allegations of inappropriate behaviour such as data manipulation, or "anything other than an honest attempt to construct a data analysis procedure". Bloomfield as a statistician considered all the choices of data processing and methods to have been "quite reasonable" in a "first of its kind study". He said "I would not have been embarrassed by that work at the time if I'd been involved in it". In response to a question from Edward Wegman on the MBH use of principal components analysis, Bloomfield said this had been reviewed by the committee along with other statistical issues, and "while the issues are real, they had a very minimal effect, not a material effect on the final reconstruction."

=== Responses ===
The U.S. House Science Committee Chairman Sherwood Boehlert issued a statement on the day of publication: "I think this report shows the value of Congress handling scientific disputes by asking scientists to give us guidance. The report clearly lays out a scientific consensus position on the historic temperature record." He noted that the report raised no doubts about global climate change or the legitimacy of any paper, and concluded that "The report does show, unsurprisingly, that scientists need to continue to work to develop a more precise sense of what global temperatures were between the beginning of the last millennium and about 1600. Congress ought to let them go about that work without political interference." In an opposing statement Senator Jim Inhofe said that "Today's NAS report reaffirms what I have been saying all along, that Mann's 'hockey stick' is broken. Today's report refutes Mann's prior assertions that there was no Medieval Warm Period or Little Ice Age." Al Gore commented that Inhofe and other deniers "will seize on anything to say up is down and black is white."

==== Blog responses on the day of publication ====
A group-authored post on RealClimate, of which Mann is one of the contributors, said "the panel has found reason to support the key mainstream findings of past research, including points that we have highlighted previously." Similarly, Roger A. Pielke Jr. said that the National Research Council publication constituted a "near-complete vindication for the work of Mann et al."; McIntyre's blog Climate Audit published a review of the report by Hans von Storch, Eduardo Zorita and Jesus Rouco, who said that it supported their view that the MBH methodology was questionable.

==== News coverage ====
On the day of publication, the Associated Press highlighted the panel's finding that "recent warmth is unprecedented for at least the last 400 years and potentially the last several millennia." In an article titled "Science Panel Backs Study on Warming Climate", Andrew Revkin of the New York Times wrote that "A controversial paper asserting that recent warming in the Northern Hemisphere was probably unrivaled for 1,000 years was endorsed today, with a few reservations, by a panel convened by the nation's pre-eminent scientific body."

Next day, the BBC News coverage on 23 June 2006 headed "Backing for 'hockey stick' graph" said the report "largely vindicates the researchers' work, first published in 1998." The Boston Globe reported that the panel had concluded that the evidence presented in the hockey stick graph was "probably true".

The Wall Street Journal story, written by the same reporter whose announcement of the McIntyre and McKitrick 2005 paper had featured on its front page, had the muted headline "Panel Study Fails To Settle Debate On Past Climates" for a piece on an inside page, which said the panel found that the key conclusion of MBH99 "is 'plausible' but not proved."

==== Further discussion ====
On 28 June 2006 Nature reported the outcome as "Academy affirms hockey-stick graph. But it criticizes the way the controversial climate result was used." The article said that the NRC panel had "concluded that systematic uncertainties in climate records from before 1600 were not communicated as clearly as they could have been". In a letter to Nature on August 10, 2006, Bradley, Hughes and Mann pointed out that this had been a comment made by North at the press conference, and was not stated in the report. The original title of their 1999 paper (MBH99) was "Northern Hemisphere temperatures during the past millennium: inferences, uncertainties, and limitations", and it had concluded that "more widespread high-resolution data are needed before more confident conclusions can be reached". They said that "the uncertainties were the point of the article", and that it was "hard to imagine how much more explicit" they could have been about the uncertainties surrounding their work. They suggested that "poor communication by others" had led to the "subsequent confusion".

At the Wegman Report hearings in July 2006, Gerald North testified that, "Dr. Wegman's criticisms of the statistical methodology in the papers by Mann et al. were consistent with our findings," referring to the NRC report that found that the methodology did not have an undue effect on the graphs. In his view, "None of the statistical criticisms that have been raised by various authors unduly influence the shape of the final reconstruction. This is attested to by the fact that reconstructions performed without using principal components yield similar results."

In a debate in the United States House of Representatives on 2 December 2009, Representative Jim Sensenbrenner said that the National Academies NRC report had discredited Mann's theory and shown the "hockey stick" graph to be incorrect. This was disputed by John Holdren, the president's science adviser, who said that although the panel had found minor issues with Mann's methods, they had confirmed his results. When the question was subsequent put to the NRC panel chairman Gerald North, he agreed with Holdren and said "The conclusions that we came to were essentially the same as the hockey stick," and the scientific conclusion that the world was warming was independent of Mann's research.

== References in chronological sequence ==
1965

- Lamb, H. (1965), "The early medieval warm epoch and its sequel", Palaeogeography, Palaeoclimatology, Palaeoecology, 1: 13–37, Bibcode:1965PPP.....1...13L, doi:10.1016/0031-0182(65)90004-0.

1978

- Landsberg, H. E.; Groveman, B. S.; Hakkarinen, I. M. (1978), "A simple method for approximating the annual temperature of the northern hemisphere", Geophysical Research Letters, 5 (6): 505–506, Bibcode:1978GeoRL...5..505L, doi:10.1029/GL005i006p00505.

1979

- Groveman, B. S.; Landsberg, H. E. (1979), "Simulated northern hemisphere temperature departures 1579-1880", Geophysical Research Letters, 6 (10): 767–769, Bibcode:1979GeoRL...6..767G, doi:10.1029/GL006i010p00767.

1989

- Jacoby, G. C.; d'Arrigo, R. (February 1989), "Reconstructed Northern Hemisphere annual temperature since 1671 based on high-latitude tree-ring data from North America", Climatic Change, 14 (1): 39–59, Bibcode:1989ClCh...14...39J, doi:10.1007/BF00140174, S2CID 153959804.

1990

- Folland, C. K. (1990), "Chap. 7: Observed Climate Variation and Change" ( (PDF)), Archived copy, archived from the original on 2018-04-13 in IPCC FAR WG1 (1990).
- IPCC FAR WG1 (1990), Houghton, J.T.; Jenkins, G.J.; Ephraums, J.J. (eds.), Climate Change: The IPCC Scientific Assessment (1990), Report prepared for Intergovernmental Panel on Climate Change by Working Group I, Cambridge University Press, ISBN 978-0-521-40360-3 (pb: 0-521-40720-6).

1991

- Fritts, H. C. (1 January 1991), Reconstructing large-scale climatic patterns from tree-ring data: a diagnostic analysis, University of Arizona Press, ISBN 978-0-8165-1218-8, OSTI 5321264.
- Bradley, R. (1991), "Global Change: The last 2000 years. Report of Working Group 1." (PDF), Global Changes of the Past, UCAR/Office for Interdisciplinary Earth Studies, Boulder, Coloradoa, pp. 11–24.

1992

- Folland, C. K. (1992), "Section C - Observed Climate Variability and Change" ( (PDF)), Archived copy, archived from the original on 2014-09-23 in IPCC supplementary report, 1992.

1993

- Graybill, D. A.; Idso, S. B. (January 1993), "Detecting the aerial fertilization effect of atmospheric CO2 enrichment in tree-ring chronologies", Global Biogeochemical Cycles, 7 (1): 81–95, Bibcode:1993GBioC...7...81G, doi:10.1029/92GB02533.
- Mann, M. E.; Park, J. (June 1993), "Spatial correlations of interdecadal variation in global surface temperatures", Geophysical Research Letters, 20 (11): 1055–1058, Bibcode:1993GeoRL..20.1055M, doi:10.1029/93GL00752.
- Bradley, R. S.; Jones, P. D. (December 1993), "'Little Ice Age' summer temperature variations; their nature and relevance to recent global warming trends" (PDF), The Holocene, 3 (4): 367–376, Bibcode:1993Holoc...3..367B, doi:10.1177/095968369300300409, S2CID 131594648.

1994

- Hughes, M. K.; Diaz, H. F. (1 March 1994), "Was there a 'medieval warm period', and if so, where and when?", Climatic Change, 26 (2–3): 109–142, Bibcode:1994ClCh...26..109H, doi:10.1007/BF01092410, S2CID 128680153.
- Mann, M. E.; Park, J. (20 December 1994), "Global scale modes of surface temperature variability on interannual to century time scales" (PDF), Journal of Geophysical Research, 99 (D12): 25819–25833, Bibcode:1994JGR....9925819M, doi:10.1029/94JD02396, archived from the original (PDF) on 6 October 2022.

1995

- Mann, M. E.; Park, J.; Bradley, R. S. (16 November 1995), "Global interdecadal and century-scale climate oscillations during the past five centuries", Nature, 378 (6554): 266–270, Bibcode:1995Natur.378..266M, doi:10.1038/378266a0, S2CID 30872107.
- Lean, J.; Beer, J.; Bradley, R. (December 1995), "Reconstruction of solar irradiance since 1610: Implications for climate change" (PDF), Geophysical Research Letters, 22 (23): 3195–3198, Bibcode:1995GeoRL..22.3195L, doi:10.1029/95GL03093, S2CID 129462333, archived from the original (PDF) on 2014-11-29.

1996

- Bradley, R. S. (1996), "Are there optimum sites for global paleotemperature reconstruction?" (PDF), in Jones, P.; Bradley, R. S.; Jouzel, J. (eds.), Climate Variations and Forcing Mechanisms of the Last 2000 years, NATO ASI Series, vol. 141, Springer-Verlag, Berlin, pp. 603–624.
- Nicholls (1996), "Chap. 3: Observed Climate Variability and Change", Climate Change 1995 - The Science of Climate Change in IPCC SAR WG1 1996.
- IPCC SAR WG1 (1996), Houghton, J.T.; Meira Filho, L.G.; Callander, B.A.; Harris, N.; Kattenberg, A.; Maskell, K. (eds.), Climate Change 1995: The Science of Climate Change, Contribution of Working Group I to the Second Assessment Report of the Intergovernmental Panel on Climate Change, Cambridge University Press, ISBN 978-0-521-56433-5 (pb: 0-521-56436-0) pdf Archived 2011-10-15 at the Wayback Machine.
- Michaels, P. (18 March 1996), Feature: Congressional Brouhaha Over U.N. Report, World Climate Report, archived from the original on 29 November 2014.

1997

- Lamb, H. H.; Clayton, K. M.; Wigley, T. M. L. (1997), "The Climatic Research Unit at Twenty-five Years", in Hulme, Michael; Barrow, Elaine (eds.), Climates of the British Isles: present, past and future, Routledge, ISBN 978-0-415-13016-5.
- Overpeck, J.; Hughen, K.; Hardy, R.; Bradley, R. (14 November 1997), "Arctic Environmental Change of the Last Four Centuries", Science, 278 (5341): 1251–1256, Bibcode:1997Sci...278.1251O, doi:10.1126/science.278.5341.1251.
- Fisher, D. A. (1997), "High resolution reconstructed Northern Hemisphere temperatures for the last few centuries: using regional average tree ring, ice core and historical annual time series", Paper U32C-7 in Supplement to EOS. Transactions.

1998

- Briffa, K. R.; Schweingruber, F. H.; Jones, P. D.; Osborn, T. J.; Shiyatov, S. G.; Vaganov, E. A. (12 February 1998), "Reduced sensitivity of recent tree-growth to temperature at high northern latitudes" (PDF), Nature, 391 (6668): 678–682, Bibcode:1998Natur.391..678B, doi:10.1038/35596, S2CID 4361534.
- Mann, M. E.; Bradley, R. S.; Hughes, M. K. (23 April 1998), "Global-scale temperature patterns and climate forcing over the past six centuries" (PDF), Nature, 392 (6678): 779–787, Bibcode:1998Natur.392..779M, doi:10.1038/33859, S2CID 129871008. Corrigendum: Mann, Bradley & Hughes 2004.
- Hegerl, G. (23 April 1998), "The past as guide to the future" (PDF), Nature, 392 (6678): 758–759, Bibcode:1998Natur.392..758H, doi:10.1038/33799, S2CID 205002951.
- Jones, P. D. (24 April 1998), "CLIMATE CHANGE: It Was the Best of Times, It Was the Worst of Times", Science, 280 (5363): 544–545, Bibcode:1998Sci...280..544., doi:10.1126/science.280.5363.544, S2CID 129324754.
- Cushman, J. H. (26 April 1998), "Industrial Group Plans To Battle Climate Treaty", New York Times.
- Stevens, W. K. (28 April 1998), "New Evidence Finds This Is Warmest Century in 600 Years", New York Times.
- Jones, P. D.; Briffa, K. R.; Barnett, T. P.; Tett, S. F. B. (May 1998), "High-resolution palaeoclimatic records for the last millennium: interpretation, integration and comparison with General Circulation Model control-run temperatures", The Holocene, 8 (4): 455–471, Bibcode:1998Holoc...8..455J, doi:10.1191/095968398667194956, S2CID 2227769.
- Michaels, P. (11 May 1998), Feature: Science Pundits Miss Big Picture Again, World Climate Report, archived from the original on 29 November 2014.
- Briffa, K. R.; Jones, P. D.; Schweingruber, F. H.; Osborn, T. J. (4 June 1998), "Influence of volcanic eruptions on Northern Hemisphere summer temperature over the past 600 years" (PDF), Nature, 393 (6684): 450–455, Bibcode:1998Natur.393..450B, doi:10.1038/30943, S2CID 4392636, archived from the original (PDF) on 1 April 2012.
- 1997: Warmest Year Since 1400?, George C. Marshall Institute, 30 June 1998, archived from the original on 2011-09-21.
- Soon, W.; Baliunas, S. (10 August 1998), Cutting Edge: The Summer of Our Discontent, World Climate Report, archived from the original on 29 November 2014.
- Mann, M. E. (28 September 1998), Cutting Edge: On Reconstructing Past Centuries' Temperatures, World Climate Report, archived from the original on 29 November 2014.
- Pollack, H. N.; Huang, S.; Shen, P.-Y. (9 October 1998), "Climate change record in subsurface temperatures: A global perspective", Science, 282 (5387): 279–281, Bibcode:1998Sci...282..279P, doi:10.1126/science.282.5387.279, PMID 9765150.

1999

- 1998 Was Warmest Year of Millennium, UMass Amherst Climate Researchers Report, UMass Amherst Office of News & Information, 3 March 1999, archived from the original on 29 June 2011.
- Mann, M. E.; Bradley, R. S.; Hughes, M.K. (1999), "Northern hemisphere temperatures during the past millennium: Inferences, uncertainties, and limitations", Geophysical Research Letters, 26 (6): 759–762, Bibcode:1999GeoRL..26..759M, doi:10.1029/1999GL900070.
- Stevens, W. K. (9 March 1999), "Song of the Millennium: Cool Prelude and a Fiery Coda", New York Times (Science News).
- Briffa, K. R.; Osborn, T. J. (7 May 1999), "CLIMATE WARMING: Seeing the Wood from the Trees", Science, 284 (5416): 926–927, Bibcode:1999Sci...284..926., doi:10.1126/science.284.5416.926, S2CID 140683312.

2000

- Briffa, K. R. (1 January 2000), "Annual climate variability in the Holocene: interpreting the message of ancient trees", Quaternary Science Reviews, 19 (1–5): 87–105, Bibcode:2000QSRv...19...87B, doi:10.1016/S0277-3791(99)00056-6.
- Huang, S.; Pollack, H. N.; Shen, P.-Y. (17 February 2000), "Temperature trends over the past five centuries reconstructed from borehole temperatures" (PDF), Nature, 403 (6771): 756–758, Bibcode:2000Natur.403..756H, doi:10.1038/35001556, hdl:2027.42/62610, PMID 10693801, S2CID 4425128.
- Crowley, T. J.; Lowery, T. S. (February 2000), "How Warm Was the Medieval Warm Period?", Ambio: A Journal of the Human Environment, 29 (1): 51–54, Bibcode:2000Ambio..29...51C, doi:10.1579/0044-7447-29.1.51, S2CID 86527510.
- Jones, P. (June 2000), CRU Information Sheet no. 5: The Millennial Temperature Record, University of East Anglia, archived from the original on 2013-12-13.

2001

- Kirby, A. (22 January 2001). "SCI/TECH: Human effect on climate 'beyond doubt'". BBC News.
- Briffa, K. R.; Osborn, T. J.; Schweingruber, F. H.; Harris, I. C.; Jones, P. D.; Shiyatov, S. G.; Vaganov, E. A. (16 February 2001), "Low-frequency temperature variations from a northern tree ring density network", Journal of Geophysical Research, 106 (D3): 2929, Bibcode:2001JGR...106.2929B, doi:10.1029/2000JD900617, S2CID 129031846.
- Broecker, W. S. (23 February 2001), "PALEOCLIMATE: Was the Medieval Warm Period Global?" (PDF), Science, 291 (5508): 1497–1499, doi:10.1126/science.291.5508.1497, PMID 11234078, S2CID 17674208, archived from the original (PDF) on 19 March 2013
- Schneider, T. (March 2001), "Analysis of Incomplete Climate Data: Estimation of Mean Values and Covariance Matrices and Imputation of Missing Values" (PDF), Journal of Climate, 14 (5): 853–871, Bibcode:2001JCli...14..853S, doi:10.1175/1520-0442(2001)014<0853:AOICDE>2.0.CO;2, S2CID 14837524.
- Daly, J. L. (2001), The Hockey Stick: A New Low in Climate Science, archived from the original on 2001-04-14 (graph attribution corrected by ).
- Jones, P. D.; Osborn, T. J.; Briffa, K. R. (27 April 2001), "The Evolution of Climate over the Last Millennium", Science, 292 (5517): 662–667, Bibcode:2001Sci...292..662J, doi:10.1126/science.1059126, PMID 11326088, S2CID 37235993.
- IPCC WG1 SPM (2001), "Summary for Policymakers", Archived copy, archived from the original on 2016-03-07 in IPCC TAR WG1 2001.
- Albritton; et al. (2001), "Technical Summary", Archived copy, archived from the original on 2011-12-24 in IPCC TAR WG1 2001.
- Folland, C. K. (2001), "Chapter 2: Observed Climate Variability and Change", Climate Change 2001 - The Scientific Basis, archived from the original on 2014-10-06 in IPCC TAR WG1 2001.
- IPCC TAR WG1 (2001), Houghton, J.T.; Ding, Y.; Griggs, D.J.; Noguer, M.; van der Linden, P.J.; Dai, X.; Maskell, K.; Johnson, C.A. (eds.), Climate Change 2001: The Scientific Basis, Contribution of Working Group I to the Third Assessment Report of the Intergovernmental Panel on Climate Change, Cambridge University Press, ISBN 978-0-521-80767-8 (pb: 0-521-01495-6).
- IPCC TAR SYR (2001), Watson, R. T.; the Core Writing Team (eds.), Climate Change 2001: Synthesis Report, Contribution of Working Groups I, II, and III to the Third Assessment Report of the Intergovernmental Panel on Climate Change, Cambridge University Press, Bibcode:2002ccsr.book.....W, ISBN 0-521-80770-0, archived from the original on 2018-11-03 (pb: 0-521-01507-3).

2002

- Esper, J.; Cook, E. R.; Schweingruber, F. H. (22 March 2002), "Low-Frequency Signals in Long Tree-Ring Chronologies for Reconstructing Past Temperature Variability", Science, 295 (5563): 2250–2253, Bibcode:2002Sci...295.2250E, doi:10.1126/science.1066208, PMID 11910106, S2CID 22184321.
- Flatow, I. (29 March 2002), "Interview: Michael Mann discusses a study that shows the pattern of global warming in the previous centuries may actually be part of a natural climate cycle, as evidenced by tree ring data" (PDF), Science Friday, NPR, archived from the original (PDF) on 2011-07-18.
- Mann, M. E.; Rutherford, S. (31 May 2002), "Climate reconstruction using 'Pseudoproxies'" (PDF), Geophysical Research Letters, 29 (10): 139–1–139–4, Bibcode:2002GeoRL..29.1501M, doi:10.1029/2001GL014554.
- de Freitas, C. R. (June 2002), "Are observed changes in the concentration of carbon dioxide in the atmosphere really dangerous?" (PDF), Bulletin of Canadian Petroleum Geology, 30 (2): 297, 307–311, archived from the original (PDF) on May 26, 2003.
- Essex, C.; McKitrick, R. (2002), Taken By Storm: the troubled science, policy, and politics of global warming, Key Porter Books, ISBN 978-1-55263-212-3.
- 2002 Annual Report (PDF), Fraser Institute, 2002, archived from the original (PDF) on 2011-08-11.

2003

- Soon, W.; Baliunas, S. (31 January 2003), "Proxy climatic and environmental changes of the past 1000 years" (PDF), Climate Research, 23 (2): 89–110, Bibcode:2003ClRes..23...89S, doi:10.3354/cr023089.
- U.S. Senate (28 July 2003), "Hearing: Science of Climate Change", Congressional Record, vol. 149, no. 113, U.S. Government Printing Office, p. S10022
- Committee on Environment & Public Works (29 July 2003), "Climate History and the Science Underlying Fate, Transport, and Health Effects of Mercury Emissions", Senate Hearing 108-359, U.S. Government Printing Office.
- Revkin, A. C. (5 August 2003), "Politics Reasserts Itself in the Debate Over Climate Change and Its Hazards", New York Times.
- Mann, M. E.; Jones, P. D. (14 August 2003), "Global surface temperatures over the past two millennia" (PDF), Geophysical Research Letters, 30 (15): 1820, Bibcode:2003GeoRL..30.1820M, doi:10.1029/2003GL017814, S2CID 5942198.
- Monastersky, R. (4 September 2003), "Storm Brews Over Global Warming", Chronicle of Higher Education.
- McIntyre, S.; McKitrick, R. (November 2003a), "Corrections to the Mann et al. (1998) Proxy Data Base and Northern Hemispheric Average Temperature Series" (PDF), Energy & Environment, 14 (6): 751–771, Bibcode:2003EnEnv..14..751M, doi:10.1260/095830503322793632, S2CID 154585461 ("MM03").
- Tech Central Station (27 October 2003), TCS Newsflash: Important Global Warming Study Audited -- Numerous Errors Found; New Research Reveals the UN IPCC 'Hockey Stick' Theory of Climate Change is Flawed, Business Wire.
- McIntyre, S. (28 October 2003), "A. Chronology of Data Correspondence", 银河官网入口-［贵宾通道］, Climate2003, archived from the original on 11 December 2003.
- McIntyre, S. (29 October 2003), Welcome to Climate2003, Climate2003, archived from the original on 29 October 2003.
- Schulz, N. (28 October 2003), "Researchers question key global-warming study [op-ed]", USA Today. [See correction of 13 November.]
- Mann, M. E.; Bradley, R. S.; Hughes, M. K. (3 November 2003), Note on Paper by McIntyre and McKitrick in Energy and Environment (PDF), University of Virginia website, archived from the original (PDF) on November 6, 2003 linked from Comments on McIntyre and McKitrick Paper as archived on 9 December 2003.
- "Corrections & Clarifications" (PDF), USA Today, 13 November 2003. [Correction to Schulz op-ed of 28 October.]
- Vergano, D. (18 November 2003), "Global warming debate heats up Capitol Hill", USA Today.
- McIntyre, S.; McKitrick, R. (18 November 2003b), The IPCC, the "Hockey Stick" Curve, and the Illusion of Experience (PDF), George C. Marshall Institute Washington Roundtable on Science and Public policy, archived from the original (PDF) on 7 May 2004.
- Mann, M. E. (2003), "On Past Temperatures and Anomalous Late-20th Century Warmth" (PDF), Eos, Transactions American Geophysical Union, 84 (27): 256, Bibcode:2003EOSTr..84..256M, doi:10.1029/2003EO270003.
- Thompson, L. G.; Mosley-Thompson, E.; Davis, M. E.; Lin, P.-N.; Henderson, K.; Mashiotta, T. A. (2003), "Tropical glacier and ice core evidence of climate change on annual to millennial time scales" (PDF), Climatic Change, 59 (1–2): 137–155, Bibcode:2003ClCh...59..137T, doi:10.1023/A:1024472313775, S2CID 18990647, archived from the original (PDF) on 2010-12-04.

2004

- Briffa, K. R.; Osborn, T. J.; Schweingruber, F. H. (January 2004), "Large-scale temperature inferences from tree rings: A review", Global and Planetary Change, 40 (1–2): 11–26, Bibcode:2004GPC....40...11B, doi:10.1016/S0921-8181(03)00095-X.
- Jones, P. D.; Mann, M. E. (6 May 2004), "Climate over past millennia" (PDF), Reviews of Geophysics, 42 (2): RG2002, Bibcode:2004RvGeo..42.2002J, doi:10.1029/2003RG000143, S2CID 2937939.
- Pollack, Henry N.; Smerdon, Jason E. (5 June 2004), "Borehole climate reconstructions: Spatial structure and hemispheric averages", Journal of Geophysical Research, 109 (D11106): D11106, Bibcode:2004JGRD..10911106P, doi:10.1029/2003JD004163, hdl:2027.42/95092, S2CID 16774065.
- Boykoff, M.; Boykoff, J. (July 2004), "Balance as bias: global warming and the US prestige press1" (PDF), Global Environmental Change Part A, 14 (2): 125–136, Bibcode:2004GEC....14..125B, doi:10.1016/j.gloenvcha.2003.10.001, archived from the original (PDF) on 2015-11-06.
- Mann, M. E.; Bradley, R. S.; Hughes, M. K. (1 July 2004), "Corrigendum: Global-scale temperature patterns and climate forcing over the past six centuries" (PDF), Nature, 430 (6995): 105, Bibcode:2004Natur.430..105M, doi:10.1038/nature02478.
- "Climate legacy of 'hockey stick'". BBC News. 16 July 2004.
- Mooney, C. (13 September 2004), "CSI | Déjà vu All Over Again", Skeptical Inquirer.
- Muller, R. (15 October 2004), Global Warming Bombshell, Technology Review.
- von Storch, H.; Zorita, E.; Jones, J. M.; Dimitriev, Y.; González-Rouco, F.; Tett, S. F. B. (22 October 2004), "Reconstructing Past Climate from Noisy Data", Science, 306 (5696): 679–682, Bibcode:2004Sci...306..679V, doi:10.1126/science.1096109, PMID 15459344, S2CID 16329419.
- Osborn, T. J.; Briffa, K. R. (22 October 2004), "CLIMATE: the Real Color of Climate Change?", Science, 306 (5696): 621–622, doi:10.1126/science.1104416, PMID 15459347, S2CID 128552394.
- McIntyre, S. (26 October 2004), "Oct. 26, 2004 "SPAGHETTI DIAGRAMS"", Webpage of Stephen McIntyre, Climate2003, archived from the original on 24 January 2005.
- Cook, E. R.; Esper, J.; d'Arrigo, R. D. (November 2004), "Extra-tropical Northern Hemisphere land temperature variability over the past 1000 years", Quaternary Science Reviews, 23 (20–22): 2063–2074, Bibcode:2004QSRv...23.2063C, doi:10.1016/j.quascirev.2004.08.013.

2005

- Inhofe, J. M. (4 January 2005), Climate Change Update Senate Floor Statement, U.S. Senator James M. Inhofe, archived from the original on 12 January 2005.
- Mann, M.; Rahmstorf, S.; Schmidt, G.; Steig, E.; Connolley, W. (10 January 2005), Senator Inhofe on Climate Change, RealClimate.
- Mooney, C. (11 January 2005), Warmed Over, CBS News. Reprinted from The American Prospect, 10 January 2005.
- Crok, M. (January 2005a), Proof that mankind causes climate change is refuted, Kyoto protocol based on flawed statistics (PDF), Natuurwetenschap & Techniek, archived from the original (PDF) on 27 October 2018 1 February 2005 issue, online publication linked from Climate Audit on 27 January.
- Crok, M. (27 January 2005b), Breaking the hockey stick, National Post, archived from the original on 20 August 2011.
- McIntyre, S. (3 February 2005), "Climateaudit", Climate Audit, Climate Audit, archived from the original on 4 February 2005.
- Moberg, A.; Sonechkin, D. M.; Holmgren, K.; Datsenko, N. M.; Karlén, W.; Lauritzen, S. E. (10 February 2005), "Highly variable Northern Hemisphere temperatures reconstructed from low- and high-resolution proxy data", Nature, 433 (7026): 613–617, Bibcode:2005Natur.433..613M, doi:10.1038/nature03265, PMID 15703742, S2CID 4359264. Corrigendum: Moberg et al. 2006.
- McIntyre, S.; McKitrick, R. (12 February 2005), "Hockey sticks, principal components, and spurious significance" (PDF), Geophysical Research Letters, 32 (3): L03710, Bibcode:2005GeoRL..32.3710M, doi:10.1029/2004GL021750.
- McKitrick, R.; McIntyre, S. (2005), "The M&M Critique of the MBH98 Northern Hemisphere Climate Index: Update and Implications" (PDF), Energy & Environment, 16 (1): 69–100, Bibcode:2005EnEnv..16...69M, doi:10.1260/0958305053516226, S2CID 154090879, archived from the original (PDF) on March 25, 2005.
- Regalado, A. (14 February 2005), "In Climate Debate, The 'Hockey Stick' Leads to a Face-Off", Wall Street Journal.
- Schmidt, G.; Ammann, C. (18 February 2005), Dummies guide to the latest "Hockey Stick" controversy, RealClimate.
- Appell, D. (21 February 2005), "Behind the Hockey Stick", Scientific American, vol. 292, no. 3, pp. 34–35, Bibcode:2005SciAm.292c..34A, doi:10.1038/scientificamerican0305-34, PMID 15859209.
- Said, Y. H. (Spring 2005), Agent-Based Simulation of Ecological Alcohol Systems, A dissertation submitted in partial fulfillment of the requirements for the degree of Doctorate of Philosophy at George Mason University (PDF), George Mason University, archived from the original (PDF) on 5 September 2006.
- Rincon, P. (16 March 2005). "Row over climate 'hockey stick'". BBC News.
- McKitrick, R. (4 April 2005), "What is the 'Hockey Stick' Debate About?", What is the 'Hockey Stick' Debate About? (PDF), Managing Climate Change—Practicalities and Realities in a Post-Kyoto Future, Parliament House, Canberra Australia: Australia Asia Pacific Economic Cooperation Study Centre, archived from the original (PDF) on 19 September 2006
- Oerlemans, J. (29 April 2005), "Extracting a Climate Signal from 169 Glacier Records" (PDF), Science, 308 (5722): 675–677, Bibcode:2005Sci...308..675O, doi:10.1126/science.1107046, PMID 15746388, S2CID 26585604.
- Revkin, A. C. (8 June 2005), "Bush Aide Softened Greenhouse Gas Links to Global Warming", The New York Times.
- Media Advisory: The Hockey Stick Controversy - New Analysis Reproduces Graph of Late 20th Century Temperature Rise, University Corporation for Atmospheric Research, 11 May 2005, archived from the original on 2005-12-27.
- House Committee on Energy and Commerce (23 June 2005), Letters Requesting Information Regarding Global Warming Studies, United States House Committee on Energy and Commerce, archived from the original on 28 June 2005.
- Barton, J.; Whitfield, E. (23 June 2005), Letter to Dr. Michael Mann (PDF), United States House Committee on Energy and Commerce, archived from the original (PDF) on 7 February 2012.
- Waxnan, H. A. (1 July 2005), Letter to Chairman Barton (PDF), henrywaxman.house.gov, archived from the original (PDF) on 2009-10-07.
- Monastersky, R. (1 July 2005), "Congressman Demands Complete Records on Climate Research by 3 Scientists Who Support Theory of Global Warming", The Chronicle of Higher Education.
- Leshner, A. I. (13 July 2005), "Letter to Joe Barton" (PDF), AAAS - The World's Largest General Scientific Society.
- Mann, M. E. (15 July 2005), Letter to Chairman Barton and Chairman Whitfield (PDF), RealClimate, archived from the original (PDF) on 27 July 2011.
- Bender, M (15 July 2005), Letter to Chairman Barton and Chairman Whitfield (PDF), RealClimate, archived from the original (PDF) on 27 July 2011.
- Schmidt, G.; Rahmstorf, S. (18 July 2005), Scientists respond to Barton, RealClimate.
- Eilperin, J. (18 July 2005), "GOP Chairmen Face Off on Global Warming", Washington Post.
- Pease, R. (18 July 2005). "Politics plays climate 'hockey'". BBC News.
- "Hunting Witches", Washington Post, 23 July 2005.
- Rutherford, S.; Mann, M. E.; Osborn, T. J.; Briffa, K. R.; Jones, P. D.; Bradley, R. S.; Hughes, M. K. (July 2005), "Proxy-Based Northern Hemisphere Surface Temperature Reconstructions: Sensitivity to Method, Predictor Network, Target Season, and Target Domain" (PDF), Journal of Climate, 18 (13): 2308–2329, Bibcode:2005JCli...18.2308R, doi:10.1175/JCLI3351.1.
- Huybers, P. (21 October 2005), "Comment on "Hockey sticks, principal components, and spurious significance" by S. McIntyre and R. McKitrick" (PDF), Geophysical Research Letters, 32 (L20705) 2005GL023395: L20705, Bibcode:2005GeoRL..3220705H, doi:10.1029/2005GL023395, S2CID 2270629, archived from the original (PDF) on 3 May 2013.
- von Storch, H.; Zorita, E. (21 October 2005), "Comment on "Hockey sticks, principal components, and spurious significance" by S. McIntyre and R. McKitrick", Geophysical Research Letters, 32 (L20701): L20701, Bibcode:2005GeoRL..3220701V, doi:10.1029/2005GL022753.
- Thacker, P. D. (31 October 2005a), "Skeptics get a journal" (PDF), Environmental Science & Technology, 39 (21): 432A–437A, Bibcode:2005EnST...39..432P, doi:10.1021/es053378b, PMID 16294841.
- Thacker, P. D. (1 November 2005b), "How a global-warming skeptic became famous", Environmental Science & Technology, 39 (21): 436A–437A, Bibcode:2005EnST...39..432P, doi:10.1021/es053378b, PMID 16294841.
- Bürger, G.; Cubasch, U. (14 December 2005), "Are multiproxy climate reconstructions robust?", Geophysical Research Letters, 32 (23): L23711, Bibcode:2005GeoRL..3223711B, doi:10.1029/2005GL024155.

2006

- D'Arrigo, R.; Wilson, R.; Jacoby, G. (7 February 2006), "On the long-term context for late twentieth century warming", Journal of Geophysical Research, 111 (D3): D03103, Bibcode:2006JGRD..111.3103D, doi:10.1029/2005JD006352.
- Osborn, T. J.; Briffa, K. R. (10 February 2006), "The Spatial Extent of 20th-Century Warmth in the Context of the Past 1200 Years", Science, 311 (5762): 841–844, Bibcode:2006Sci...311..841O, doi:10.1126/science.1120514, PMID 16469924, S2CID 129718548.
- Regalado, A. (10 February 2006a), Academy to Referee Climate-Change Fight, Wall Street Journal.
- Moberg, A.; Sonechkin, D. M.; Holmgren, K.; Datsenko, N. M.; Karlén, W.; Lauritzen, S.-E. (23 February 2006), "Corrigendum: Highly variable Northern Hemisphere temperatures reconstructed from low- and high-resolution proxy data", Nature, 439 (7079): 1014, Bibcode:2006Natur.439.1014M, doi:10.1038/nature04575.
- Hegerl, G. C.; Crowley, T. J.; Hyde, W. T.; Frame, D. J. (20 April 2006), "Climate sensitivity constrained by temperature reconstructions over the past seven centuries", Nature, 440 (7087): 1029–1032, Bibcode:2006Natur.440.1029H, doi:10.1038/nature04679, PMID 16625192, S2CID 4387059.
- Wahl, E. R.; Ritson, D. M.; Ammann, C. M. (28 April 2006), "Comment on 'Reconstructing Past Climate from Noisy Data'", Science, 312 (5773): 529b, Bibcode:2006Sci...312.....W, doi:10.1126/science.1120866, PMID 16645079.
- Smith, C. L.; Baker, A.; Fairchild, I. J.; Frisia, S.; Borsato, A. (3 May 2006), "Reconstructing hemispheric-scale climates from multiple stalagmite records", International Journal of Climatology, 26 (10): 1417–1424, Bibcode:2006IJCli..26.1417S, doi:10.1002/joc.1329, hdl:2381/20592, S2CID 128393190, Figure 1.
- Gore, A. (26 May 2006), An inconvenient truth: the planetary emergency of global warming and what we can do about it, Bloomsbury, pp. 63–65, ISBN 978-0-7475-8906-8, "Rodale Books; First Edition (May 26, 2006)".
- Hoke, G. (2006), "An Inconvenient Truth - Transcript", Ice Cores: The 650,000 Record, archived from the original on 2006-11-05.
- "[Audio recording of National Academies press conference]". The National Academies. 22 June 2006. Real Audio or mp3 download.
- North, G. R. (22 June 2006), Surface temperature reconstructions for the last 2,000 years, Washington, D.C.: National Academies Press, ISBN 978-0-309-10225-4. (North Report).
- Office of News and Public Information (22 June 2006), 'High Confidence' That Planet Is Warmest in 400 Years, The National Academies.
- Boehlert, S. (22 June 2006), Statement by Science Committee Chairman Sherwood Boehlert (R-NY) regarding the National Academy of Sciences Report, Surface Temperature Reconstructions for the Last 2,000 Years: (PDF), Committee on Science - U.S. House of Representatives, archived from the original (PDF) on 29 June 2006.
- National Academies Synthesis Report, RealClimate, 22 June 2006.
- Revkin, A. C. (22 June 2006), "Science Panel Backs Study on Warming Climate", New York Times.
- Pielke, R. (22 June 2006), "Quick Reaction to the NRC Hockey Stick Report", Prometheus: The Science Policy Blog (CIRES), archived from the original on 2010-07-03. (Announcement of North et al. 2006.)
- von Storch, H.; Zorita, E.; González-Rouco, F. (22 June 2006), Press release and comment on the NAS report "Surface Temperature Reconstructions for the last 200 Years".
- Heilprin, J. (23 June 2006) [22 June 2006]. "Study: Earth is hottest now in 2,000 years; humans responsible for much of the warming". USA Today..
- "Backing for 'hockey stick' graph". BBC News. 23 June 2006..
- Daley, B. (23 June 2006), "National panel supports '98 global warming evidence", The Boston Globe.
- Regalado, A. (23 June 2006), "Panel Study Fails To Settle Debate On Past Climates", Wall Street Journal.
- Brumfiel, G. (29 June 2006), "Academy affirms hockey-stick graph", Nature, 441 (7097): 1032–3, Bibcode:2006Natur.441.1032B, doi:10.1038/4411032a, PMID 16810211.
- Rahmstorf, S. (30 June 2006), "Testing Climate Reconstructions" (PDF), Science, 312 (5782): 1872–1873, doi:10.1126/science.312.5782.1872b, PMID 16809508, S2CID 35196366.
- "Hockey Stick Hokum", Wall Street Journal, 14 July 2006.
- War of words over new climate change report, 'hockey stick' model: Leading scientist says House climate report is "politicized", Mongabay.com, 16 July 2006, archived from the original on 7 May 2013.
- U.S. House Committee on Energy and Commerce — Press Office (2006), Report Raises New Questions About Climate Change Assessments (PDF), archived from the original (PDF) on 2006-07-19.
- Wegman, E. J.; Said, Y. H.; Scott, D. W. (14 July 2006), "Ad Hoc Committee Report On The 'Hockey Stick' Global Climate Reconstruction" (PDF), Congressional Report, United States House Committee on Energy and Commerce, archived from the original (PDF) on 16 July 2006 (Wegman Report).
- Quiggin, J. (15 July 2006), Adventures in social network analysis, Crooked Timber.
- The missing piece at the Wegman hearing, RealClimate, 19 July 2006.
- House Committee on Energy and Commerce (July 2006), "Questions surrounding the 'Hockey stick' temperature studies; implications for climate change assessments", Hearings before the Subcommittee on Oversight and Investigations of the Committee on Energy and Commerce, 109th Congress, Second session, U.S. Government Printing Office (154 MB PDF).
- Bradley, R. S.; Hughes, M. K.; Mann, M. E. (10 August 2006), "Authors were clear about hockey-stick uncertainties", Nature, 442 (7103): 627, Bibcode:2006Natur.442..627B, doi:10.1038/442627b, PMID 16900179.
- Ritson, D. (16 August 2006), letter to Congressman Henry Waxman (PDF), enclosure: e-mailed requests.
- North, G. (29 August 2006b), Surface Temperature Reconstructions for the Last Millennium, Texas A&M University, archived from the original (mp4 audio and presentation) on 7 March 2012.
- Monastersky, R. (moderator) (6 September 2006), "A Scientific Graph Stands Trial", The Chronicle of Higher Education — Live Discussions, archived from the original on 2007-09-30.
- Monastersky, R. (8 September 2006), "Climate Science on Trial", The Chronicle of Higher Education.
- Pearce, F. (4 November 2006), Climate change special: State of denial - environment, New Scientist.

2007

- von Storch, H.; Zorita, E. (3 May 2007), Climate Feedback: The decay of the hockey stick, Nature Climate Change blog, archived from the original on 2011-01-02.
- McIntyre, S. (3 May 2007), "von Storch and Zorita blog on the Hockey Stick", Climate Audit, Climate Audit.
- Heffernan, O. (3 May 2007a), Hans von Storch and Eduardo Zorita on the Hockey stick effect, Blogs.nature.com, archived from the original on 2011-01-02.,
- Heffernan, O. (3 May 2007b), Hans von Storch, Blogs.nature.com, archived from the original on 2011-01-02.
- Ammann, C. M.; Wahl, E. R. (24 August 2007), "The importance of the geophysical context in statistical evaluations of climate reconstruction procedures" (PDF), Climatic Change, 85 (1–2): 71–88, Bibcode:2007ClCh...85...71A, doi:10.1007/s10584-007-9276-x, S2CID 36909046.
- Wahl, E. R.; Ammann, C. M. (31 August 2007), "Robustness of the Mann, Bradley, Hughes reconstruction of Northern Hemisphere surface temperatures: Examination of criticisms based on the nature and processing of proxy climate evidence" (PDF), Climatic Change, 85 (1–2): 33–69, Bibcode:2007ClCh...85...33W, doi:10.1007/s10584-006-9105-7, S2CID 18640802, archived from the original (PDF) on 24 January 2013.
- Said, Y. H. (7 September 2007), "Experiences with Congressional Testimony: Statistics and The Hockey Stick" ( (PDF)), Data and Statistical Sciences Colloquium Series, George Mason University, archived from the original on 16 February 2010.
- Juckes, M. N.; Allen, M. R.; Briffa, K. R.; Esper, J.; Hegerl, G. C.; Moberg, Anders; Osborn, T. J.; Weber, S. L. (5 October 2007), "Millennial temperature reconstruction intercomparison and evaluation" (PDF), Climate of the Past, 3 (4): 591–609, Bibcode:2007CliPa...3..591J, doi:10.5194/cp-3-591-2007.
- Waxman, H. (12 December 2007), "Committee Report: White House Engaged in Systematic Effort to Manipulate Climate Change Science", Committee on Oversight and Government Reform, United States House of Representatives, archived from the original on 25 April 2012 Report pp. 21–25.
- Jansen, E. (2007), "Chapter 6: Palaeoclimate", Archived copy, archived from the original on 2013-11-25 in IPCC AR4 WG1 2007.
- IPCC AR4 WG1 (2007), Solomon, S.; et al. (eds.), Climate Change 2007: The Physical Science Basis, Contribution of Working Group I to the Fourth Assessment Report of the Intergovernmental Panel on Climate Change, Cambridge University Press, ISBN 978-0-521-88009-1 (pb: 978-0-521-70596-7).

2008

- Said, Y. H.; Wegman, E. J.; Sharabati, W. K.; Rigsby, J. T. (January 2008), "Social networks of author–coauthor relationships", Computational Statistics & Data Analysis, 51 (4): 2177–2184, doi:10.1016/j.csda.2007.07.021. Retracted.
- Huang, S.; Pollack, H. N.; Shen, P. Y. (4 July 2008), "A late Quaternary climate reconstruction based on borehole heat flux data, borehole temperature data, and the instrumental record" (PDF), Geophysical Research Letters, 35 (L13703): L13703, Bibcode:2008GeoRL..3513703H, doi:10.1029/2008GL034187, hdl:2027.42/95180, S2CID 11399172, archived from the original (PDF) on 27 February 2012.
- Lee, T. C. K.; Zwiers, F. W.; Tsao, Min (1 August 2008), "Evaluation of proxy-based millennial reconstruction methods", Climate Dynamics, 31 (2–3): 263–281, Bibcode:2008ClDy...31..263L, doi:10.1007/s00382-007-0351-9, S2CID 3325498.
- Black, R. (1 September 2008). "Climate 'hockey stick' is revived". BBC News.
- Mann, M. E.; Zhang, Z.; Hughes, M. K.; Bradley, R. S.; Miller, S. K.; Rutherford, S.; Ni, F. (9 September 2008), "Proxy-based reconstructions of hemispheric and global surface temperature variations over the past two millennia", Proceedings of the National Academy of Sciences of the United States of America, 105 (36): 13252–13257, Bibcode:2008PNAS..10513252M, doi:10.1073/pnas.0805721105, PMC 2527990, PMID 18765811.
- Muller, R. (2008), Physics for future presidents: the science behind the headlines, W.W. Norton & Co., ISBN 978-0-393-06627-2.
- Weart, S. R. (2008), The Discovery of Global Warming (revised ed.), Harvard University Press, ISBN 978-0-674-03189-0. Provides an overview of The Discovery of Global Warming Archived 2011-08-04 at the Wayback Machine website.

2009

- Jones, P. D. (February 2009), "High-resolution palaeoclimatology of the last millennium: a review of current status and future prospects" (PDF), The Holocene, 19 (1): 3–49, Bibcode:2009Holoc..19....3J, doi:10.1177/0959683608098952, S2CID 129606908, archived from the original (PDF) on 2015-10-14.
- McIntyre, S.; McKitrick, R. (February 2009), "Proxy inconsistency and other problems in millennial paleoclimate reconstructions", Proc. Natl. Acad. Sci. U.S.A., 106 (6): E10, author reply E11, Bibcode:2009PNAS..106E..10M, doi:10.1073/pnas.0812509106, PMC 2647809, PMID 19188613.
- Mann, M. E.; Bradley, R. S.; Hughes, Malcolm K. (10 February 2009), "Reply to McIntyre and McKitrick: Proxy-based temperature reconstructions are robust", PNAS, 106 (6): E11, Bibcode:2009PNAS..106E..11M, doi:10.1073/pnas.0812936106, PMC 2644169.
- Arctic Warming Overtakes 2,000 Years of Natural Cooling, University Corporation for Atmospheric Research, 3 September 2009, archived from the original on 27 April 2011.
- Bello, D. (4 September 2009), "Global Warming Reverses Long-Term Arctic Cooling", Scientific American.
- Kaufman, D. (4 September 2009), "Recent warming reverses long-term arctic cooling", Science, 325 (5945): 1236–1239, Bibcode:2009Sci...325.1236K, doi:10.1126/science.1173983, PMID 19729653, S2CID 23844037.
- Appell, D. (28 October 2009), "Novel Analysis Confirms Climate "Hockey Stick" Graph", Scientific American.
- Hickman, L. (20 November 2009), "Climate sceptics claim leaked emails are evidence of collusion among scientists", The Guardian.
- Communications Office (23 November 2009), Climatic Research Unit update - 17.45 November 23, University of East Anglia, archived from the original on 2 December 2009.
- Communications Office (24 November 2009), CRU update 2, University of East Anglia, archived from the original on 11 December 2009.
- Johnson, K.; Naik, G. (24 November 2009), "Lawmakers Probe Climate Emails", Wall Street Journal, archived from the original on 28 December 2009.
- Mann, M. E.; Zhang, Z.; Rutherford, S.; Bradley, R. S.; Hughes, M. K.; Shindell, D.; Ammann, C. M.; Faluvegi, G.; Ni, F. (27 November 2009), "Global Signatures and Dynamical Origins of the Little Ice Age and Medieval Climate Anomaly" (PDF), Science, 326 (5957): 1256–1260, Bibcode:2009Sci...326.1256M, doi:10.1126/science.1177303, PMID 19965474, S2CID 18655276.
- "Climatologists under pressure", Nature, 462 (7273): 545, 3 December 2009, Bibcode:2009Natur.462..545., doi:10.1038/462545a, PMID 19956212.
- Borenstein, S. (3 December 2009), Business & Technology: Obama science advisers grilled over hacked e-mails, Seattle Times Newspaper.
- Michaels, P. (18 December 2009), "How to Manufacture a Climate Consensus", Wall Street Journal.
- von Storch, H. (22 December 2009), "Good Science, Bad Politics", Wall Street Journal.
- Mann, M. E. (31 December 2009), "Science Must Be Unpolluted by Politics", Wall Street Journal.
- Weart, S. R. (December 2009), "Climate over Millennia (Hockey Stick graph)", The Discovery of Global Warming, archived from the original on 2015-03-06.

2010

- Pearce, Fred (9 February 2010), "Part two: How the 'climategate' scandal is bogus and based on climate sceptics' lies", Environment, The Guardian, London.
- Pearce, Fred (9 February 2010), "Part three: Hockey stick graph took pride of place in IPCC report, despite doubts", Environment, The Guardian, London.
- Pearce, Fred (9 February 2010), "Part four: Climate change debate overheated after sceptics grasped 'hockey stick'", Environment, The Guardian, London.
- Tingley, M. P.; Huybers, P. (May 2010a), "A Bayesian Algorithm for Reconstructing Climate Anomalies in Space and Time. Part I: Development and Applications to Paleoclimate Reconstruction Problems", Journal of Climate, 23 (10): 2759–2781, Bibcode:2010JCli...23.2759T, doi:10.1175/2009JCLI3015.1, S2CID 4709675.
- Tingley, M. P.; Huybers, P. (May 2010b), "A Bayesian Algorithm for Reconstructing Climate Anomalies in Space and Time. Part II: Comparison with the Regularized Expectation–Maximization Algorithm", Journal of Climate, 23 (10): 2782–2800, Bibcode:2010JCli...23.2782T, doi:10.1175/2009JCLI3016.1, S2CID 4709733.
- Frank, D.; Esper, J.; Zorita, E.; Wilson, R. (14 May 2010), "A noodle, hockey stick, and spaghetti plate: A perspective on high-resolution paleoclimatology", Wiley Interdisciplinary Reviews: Climate Change, 1 (4): 507–516, Bibcode:2010WIRCC...1..507F, doi:10.1002/wcc.53, S2CID 16524970.
- Russell, M.; Boulton, G.; Clark, P.; Eyton, D.; Norton, J. (7 July 2010), The Independent Climate Change E-mails Review (PDF) "ICCER".
- Chameides, B. (30 August 2010), "Climategate Redux", Scientific American, archived from the original on 7 March 2012.
- Ljungqvist, F. C. (September 2010), "A New Reconstruction of Temperature Variability in the Extra-Tropical Northern Hemisphere During the Last Two Millennia" (PDF), Geografiska Annaler: Series A, Physical Geography, 92 (3): 339–351, Bibcode:2010GeAnA..92..339L, doi:10.1111/j.1468-0459.2010.00399.x, S2CID 55018654.
- Vergano, D. (8 October 2010), "University investigating prominent climate science critic", USA Today.
- Vergano, D. (22 November 2010), "Experts claim 2006 climate report plagiarized", USA Today.
- Pearce, F. (2010), The Climate Files: The Battle for the Truth About Global Warming, Random House UK, ISBN 978-0-85265-229-9.

2011

- Vergano, D. (15 May 2011), "Climate study gets pulled after charges of plagiarism", USA Today.
- Vergano, D. (16 May 2011), "Retracted climate critics' study panned by expert", USA Today.
- "Copy and paste", Nature, 473 (7348): 419–420, 26 May 2011, Bibcode:2011Natur.473R.419., doi:10.1038/473419b, PMID 21614031.
- Kintisch, E. (2 June 2011), Journal Retracts Disputed Network Analysis Paper on Climate, ScienceInsider, archived from the original on 7 June 2011.
- Weart, S. R. (2003–2011), The Discovery of Global Warming (website), American Institute of Physics, archived from the original on 2012-05-21. Chapters are available as pdf files Archived 2014-10-29 at the Wayback Machine.
- Weart, S. R. (February 2011c), "Modern Temperature Trend", The Discovery of Global Warming, archived from the original on 2012-05-21. Available as a pdf Archived 2014-11-29 at the Wayback Machine.
- Weart, S. R. (February 2011f), "The Carbon Dioxide Greenhouse Effect", The Discovery of Global Warming, archived from the original on 2012-05-21. Available as a pdf Archived 2013-09-24 at the Wayback Machine.
- Weart, S. R. (December 2011o), "Government: The View from Washington, DC", The Discovery of Global Warming, archived from the original on 2012-05-21. Available as a pdf Archived 2014-11-29 at the Wayback Machine.
- Christiansen, B.; Ljungqvist, F. C. (December 2011), "Reconstruction of the Extratropical NH Mean Temperature over the Last Millennium with a Method that Preserves Low-Frequency Variability", Journal of Climate, 24 (23): 6013–6034, Bibcode:2011JCli...24.6013C, doi:10.1175/2011JCLI4145.1. (reply to comments by A. Moberg)

2012

- Ljungqvist, F. C.; Krusic, P. J.; Brattström, G.; Sundqvist, H. S. (3 February 2012), "Northern Hemisphere temperature patterns in the last 12 centuries", Climate of the Past, 8 (1): 227–249, Bibcode:2012CliPa...8..227L, doi:10.5194/cp-8-227-2012.
- Vergano, D. (22 February 2012), "University reprimands climate science critic for plagiarism", USA Today.
- Mann, M. E. (6 March 2012), "The Hockey Stick and the Climate Wars: Dispatches from the Front Lines", Physics Today, vol. 65, Columbia University Press, p. 54, Bibcode:2012PhT....65f..54O, doi:10.1063/PT.3.1607, ISBN 978-0-231-15254-9.
- Christiansen, B.; Ljungqvist, F. C. (18 April 2012), "The extra-tropical Northern Hemisphere temperature in the last two millennia: Reconstructions of low-frequency variability" (PDF), Climate of the Past, 8 (2): 765–786, Bibcode:2012CliPa...8..765C, doi:10.5194/cp-8-765-2012.

2013

- Connor, S. (24 January 2013), "How the 'Kochtopus' stifled green debate - Climate Change - Environment", The Independent, archived from the original on 2022-06-21.
- Lemonick, M. D. (7 March 2013), Climate to Warm Beyond Levels Seen for 11,300 Years, Climate Central.
- Gillis, J. (7 March 2013), "Global Temperatures Highest in 4,000 Years, Study Says - NYTimes.com", New York Times.
- Marcott, S. A.; Shakun, J. D.; Clark, P. U.; Mix, A. C. (8 March 2013), "A Reconstruction of Regional and Global Temperature for the Past 11,300 Years", Science, 339 (6124): 1198–1201, Bibcode:2013Sci...339.1198M, doi:10.1126/science.1228026, PMID 23471405, S2CID 29665980.
