= Geoscientist =

Geoscientist may refer to:

- Geoscientist, a person studying Earth or other planets using Earth science
  - Geochemist (see Geochemistry)
  - Geologist, a scientist who studies the solid, liquid, and gaseous matter that constitutes the Earth and other terrestrial planets
  - Geophysicist (see Geophysics)
  - Planetologist (see Planetary science)
- Geoscientist (magazine), the official membership magazine of the Geological Society of London
