= The New Climate War =

2021 book by Michael E. Mann

The New Climate War The Fight to Take Back Our Planet
- Author: Michael E. Mann
- Subject: Climate change
- Publisher: PublicAffairs
- Publication date: 12 January 2021
- Media type: Print
- Pages: 368 pp (hardcover)
- ISBN: 978-1-541-75822-3

The New Climate War: The Fight to Take Back Our Planet is a 2021 book on climate change by the American climatologist and geophysicist Michael E. Mann. In the book, Mann discusses the actions of the fossil fuel industry to delay action on climate change, the responses to climate change that he considers inadequate, and the responses he considers the best. The book received positive reviews. Mann argued in an interview with Rolling Stone's Jeff Goodell that a "clean energy revolution and climate stabilization are achievable with current technology. All we require are policies to incentivize the needed shift."

== Background ==
Mann's famous "hockey stick" graph led to death threats and online attacks. He later became an expert in disinformation campaigns of the fossil fuel industry.

While Goodell said that much of the left had come to view carbon pricing as "basically a kind of neoliberal scheme that will enrich Wall Street and inevitably be corrupted by politics": Mann wrote that "really all of the solutions that we’re talking about are market economics", and also listed the Montreal Protocol in the past as a reason for optimism about carbon pricing.

However, the climatologist also stated that humanity may need to rethink the basic conceptual model for modern economies because "[there] is a larger conversation to be had about whether we can continue on this path of increasing resource extraction and consumption in a sustainable manner." He also said the Green New Deal won't occur in 2021 or 2022: "We’ll get past the pandemic. A year or two down the road, it’ll be in our rear-view mirror, but we will still be fully immersed in an even greater crisis, which is the climate crisis. And hopefully, having gone through this pandemic, this crisis will provide us an opportunity to think about how we solve this even larger crisis."

Mann criticized the Trump administration but said enough was "happening at the state level, states that support action, companies, cities, municipalities, that we did make some progress [...] we need to make up that lost ground over the next several years. And the Biden administration seems to be doing everything they can to help make that happen."

== Title ==
Mann explained that the book's title (The New Climate War) comes from his view that there was an old climate war of "assault on the basic science of climate change by fossil fuel interests" and there is now a new climate war (due to the impacts of climate change no longer being subtle), with opponents of climate action having different tactics like "getting climate advocates fighting with each other so that we don’t present a unified voice, demanding change [...] deflecting attention away from the needed systemic solutions or policy solutions to [focus instead on] individual behavior." The old war was 'outright denial'; the new war is 'deception, distraction and delay', including deflection of threats and division of opponents.

== Summary ==
The New Climate War consists of nine chapters, along with acknowledgements, notes, and an index.

"The Architects of Misinformation and Misdirection" and "The Climate Wars" outline the history of climate change denial. The third chapter, "The 'Crying Indian' and the Birth of the Deflection Campaign", details how forces of denial and delay (such as fossil fuel companies, right-wing partisans, media and talking heads, and oil-funded governments) use deflection to defeat disliked policies. "It's YOUR Fault" is about the strategy to "keep the conversation around individual responsibility, not systemic change or corporate culpability", noting such things as Russian trolls' and bots' attacks on Hillary Clinton during the 2016 United States presidential election campaign, and bot-produced tweets to increase the level of denialism in online discourse about climate crisis. In the same chapter, Mann argues that Russian interference with the aim of improving Donald Trump's chances could be summed up as born of the government of Russia's material interest in getting its own fossil fuels to the world market.

The fifth chapter ("Put a Price on It. Or Not.") criticizes the subsidies granted to the fuel industry. Mann advocates a price on carbon emissions as well as supply-side measures like a fracking ban and blocks on pipeline construction. In "Sinking the Competition", he supports incentives for renewable energy and elimination of incentives for fossil fuels. In chapter seven ("The Non-Solution Solution"), the author dismisses responses like natural gas, carbon capture, and geo-engineering as inadequate, and describes a number of notions of opponents of climate action (such as bridge fuels, clean coal, adaptation, and resilience) as "empty promises".

In "The Truth Is Bad Enough", Mann criticizes some environmentalists as exaggerating the climate threat. The final chapter, "Meeting the Challenge", contains a four-point plan of: "Disregard the Doomsayers", "A Child Shall Lead Them", "Educate, Educate, Educate", and "Changing the System Requires Systemic Change".

Mann argues that individual actions like less meat-eating, less travel, and more recycling are beneficial but insufficient, and that the economy must be decarbonized. The climate scientist also describes himself as cautiously optimistic given youth activism and the rapid development of green technologies.

== Reception ==
Jeff Masters wrote in Yale Climate Connections that The New Climate War "could benefit from more graphics and cartoons as complements to its 267 pages of text. Overall, though, the book still is a must-read for every climate-savvy and climate-dependent. (Only air breathers need apply!)" New Scientist's Richard Schiffman stated, "With the major COP26 UN climate summit due to be held later this year in Glasgow, UK, Mann’s call to get serious about climate change couldn’t be more timely. Let’s hope he is right that the tide is finally about to turn."

Adrienne Hollis wrote that "the book ties together every action and every inaction that has affected the fight to protect Earth from the adverse consequences of climate change. Mann is transparent about times when those who fight for climate action have fallen short". She described the book as "a must read not just for people currently working to address climate change but also for those who are new to the climate fight, the latter of whom will learn much about past challenges, struggles, and attacks".

Carolyn Gramling argued in Science News: "The New Climate War's main focus is to combat psychological warfare, and on this front, the book is fascinating and often entertaining. It’s an engrossing mix of footnoted history, acerbic political commentary and personal anecdotes." A reviewer in Kirkus Reviews dubbed it a "blunt, lucid work of climate politics [...] Consistently displaying his comprehensive command of climate science and the attendant politics, he clearly walks readers through the disingenuous arguments about" a number of policies and trends related to climate crisis.

The Financial Times short-listed the book for 2021 "business book of the year".

It was also longlisted for the 2021 Wainwright Prize.
