= Gerald North =

Gerald R. North (June 28, 1938 – ) is Distinguished Professor and Holder of the Harold J. Haynes Endowed Chair in Geosciences at Texas A&M University, and previous Head of the Department of Atmospheric Sciences. His interests include climate change using simplified climate models.

North was born in Sweetwater, Tennessee to Sanford and Marjorie Hill North. He grew up in nearby Knoxville and received his Bachelor's Degree in physics from the University of Tennessee. In 1966, he earned a Ph.D. in Physics from the University of Wisconsin–Madison. After a two year post-doc at the University of Pennsylvania, he obtained a tenure track position at the University of Missouri–St. Louis leading to full professor. He spent 1974–75 as a Senior Visiting Scientist at the National Center for Atmospheric Research. He moved to NASA Goddard Space Flight Center in 1978 where he was the initial proposer and first Study Scientist for the Tropical Rainfall Measuring Mission. He joined Texas A&M University in 1986.

In 2005 to 2006 he chaired a United States National Research Council committee investigating surface temperature reconstructions for the last 2,000 years, set up at the request of Representative Sherwood Boehlert, chairman of the U.S. House of Representatives Committee on Science. Their report, published in July 2006, is known as the North Report. He is the 2008 recipient of the Jule Charney Award of the American Meteorological Society.

He lives in Kyle, Texas with his wife Laura.

His Memoir The Rise of Climate Science was released in Spring 2021
