= Rand Simberg =

American blogger

- Born: Flint, Michigan, U.S.
- Education: West Coast University (MS) University of Michigan (BS)
- Known for: Author and tech journalist
- Website: http://www.transterrestrial.com

Rand Simberg is an American aerospace engineer, space policy analyst, consultant, author, blogger, and commentator. He is known for advocating commercial space development, reduced regulatory burdens on human spaceflight where appropriate, clear property rights in space, and a risk-tolerant approach to exploration that views space as a frontier for human settlement and economic expansion.

== Early life and education ==
Born in Flint, Michigan, Simberg earned two Bachelor of Science degrees from the University of Michigan in Ann Arbor: one in Engineering Science and one in Applied Mathematics, with a concentration in astronautical engineering (circa 1976–1979). He later received an M.S. in Technical Management from West Coast University in Los Angeles.

== Career ==
With over 40 years in the space industry, Simberg held engineering and management roles at The Aerospace Corporation (El Segundo, California) and Rockwell International (Downey, California). Since 1993, he has worked independently as a consultant on space technology, commercialization, business development, regulatory policy, and entrepreneurship, with a focus on commercial human spaceflight.

He was formerly an adjunct scholar at the Competitive Enterprise Institute (CEI), contributing space policy analysis. His writings have appeared in Popular Mechanics, USA Today, National Review, Fox News, Reason, The Weekly Standard, The Washington Times, SpaceNews, PJ Media, and others.

He runs the blog Transterrestrial Musings (transterrestrial.com) on space policy and related topics and is active on X as @Rand_Simberg and @Simberg_Space.

He has spoken at events including the 2020 Free Market Forum by Hillsdale College in Omaha, Nebraska, presenting on space economics and market-driven development in a panel discussion.

== Publications and views ==
Simberg is the author of Safe Is Not an Option: Overcoming the Futile Obsession with 'Getting Everyone Back Alive' That Is Killing Our Expansion into Space (2013, Interglobal Media; foreword by astronaut Ed Lu), which critiques excessive risk aversion in space policy and advocates for calculated risks to enable progress.

He has contributed extensively to The New Atlantis (journal) on space commercialization and reform, with essays including "There Is a Planet B" (2024 review of Robert Zubrin's Mars vision), "Walmart, But for Space" (2021 on cost reductions), "The Return of the Space Visionaries" (2018), "Getting Over ‘Apolloism’" (2016), "Keep the FAA’s Head in the Clouds" (2016 online exclusive against expanded FAA oversight), "In Defense of Daring" (2014), "Property Rights in Space" (2012), and earlier works like "The New Pioneers" (2007), "Space Deals" (2006), and "The Path Not Taken" (2004). Additional pieces include "In Search of a Conservative Space Policy" (2010) and "A Space Program for the Rest of Us" (2009).

From 2009–2012, he wrote for Popular Mechanics on NASA programs, SpaceX reusability, and Space Shuttle lessons. His USA Today op-eds (primarily 2013–2016) addressed topics like the Challenger legacy, JFK space race myths, NASA safety priorities, and space independence from Russia. Contributions to National Review span 2003–2014, covering NASA reform and related issues. His work consistently promotes private-sector innovation (e.g., SpaceX, Blue Origin) and positions space as essential for humanity's long-term future.

== Awards and recognition ==
In 2011, Simberg received the NewSpace Journalism Award from the Space Frontier Foundation for a series of satirical animations critiquing NASA policy—particularly the high costs, delays, and government-centric model of the SLS and Orion programs.

== Personal life ==
Based in Jackson, Wyoming, with homes in Redondo Beach, CA and Golden, CO, Simberg describes himself as a "recovering aerospace engineer."

== Legal travails ==
In early 2024, Simberg was found guilty by a DC jury of defaming climate scientist Michael Mann. The suit was based on a column Simberg wrote on the Competitive Enterprise Institute website that compared the way Penn State treated Mann with the way that it treated convicted child molester Jerry Sandusky.

Simberg wrote: "Mann could be said to be the Jerry Sandusky of climate science, except that instead of molesting children, he has molested and tortured data in the service of politicized science that could have dire economic consequences for the nation and planet."

The jury awarded Mann one dollar in nominal damages, and a thousand dollars in punitive damages. However, Mann owes Simberg several thousand dollars in legal fees for false representations to the jury about loss of grant funding, and almost half a million dollars to Simberg and the Competitive Enterprise Institute for losing an anti-SLAPP case.
