= Temperature record of the last 2,000 years =

Temperature trends in the Common Era

Global average temperatures show that the Medieval Warm Period was not a planet-wide phenomenon, and that the Little Ice Age was not a distinct planet-wide time period but rather the end of a long temperature decline that preceded recent global warming.

The temperature record of the last 2,000 years is reconstructed using data from climate proxy records in conjunction with the modern instrumental temperature record which only covers the last 170 years at a global scale. Large-scale reconstructions covering part or all of the 1st millennium and 2nd millennium have shown that recent temperatures are exceptional: the Intergovernmental Panel on Climate Change Fourth Assessment Report of 2007 concluded that "Average Northern Hemisphere temperatures during the second half of the 20th century were very likely higher than during any other 50-year period in the last 500 years and likely the highest in at least the past 1,300 years." The curve shown in graphs of these reconstructions is widely known as the hockey stick graph because of the sharp increase in temperatures during the last century. As of 2010 this broad pattern was supported by more than two dozen reconstructions, using various statistical methods and combinations of proxy records, with variations in how flat the pre-20th-century "shaft" appears. Sparseness of proxy records results in considerable uncertainty for earlier periods.

Individual proxy records, such as tree ring widths and densities used in dendroclimatology, are calibrated against the instrumental record for the period of overlap. Networks of such records are used to reconstruct past temperatures for regions: tree ring proxies have been used to reconstruct Northern Hemisphere extratropical temperatures (within the tropics trees do not form rings) but are confined to land areas and are scarce in the Southern Hemisphere which is largely ocean. Wider coverage is provided by multiproxy reconstructions, incorporating proxies such as lake sediments, ice cores and corals which are found in different regions, and using statistical methods to relate these sparser proxies to the greater numbers of tree ring records. The "Composite Plus Scaling" (CPS) method is widely used for large-scale multiproxy reconstructions of hemispheric or global average temperatures; this is complemented by Climate Field Reconstruction (CFR) methods which show how climate patterns have developed over large spatial areas, making the reconstruction useful for investigating natural variability and long-term oscillations as well as for comparisons with patterns produced by climate models.

During the 1,900 years before the 20th century, it is likely that the next warmest period was from 950 to 1100, with peaks at different times in different regions. This has been called the Medieval Warm Period, and some evidence suggests widespread cooler conditions during a period around the 17th century known as the Little Ice Age. In the "hockey stick controversy", climate change deniers have asserted that the Medieval Warm Period was warmer than at present, and have disputed the data and methods of climate reconstructions.

== Temperature change in the last 2,000 years ==
According to IPCC Sixth Assessment Report, in the last 170 years, humans have caused the global temperature to increase to the highest level in the last 2,000 years. The current multi-century period is the warmest in the past 100,000 years. The temperature in the years 2011-2020 was 1.09 °C higher than in 1859–1890. The temperature on land rose by 1.59 °C while over the ocean it rose by 0.88 °C. In 2020 the temperature was 1.2 °C above the pre-industrial era. In September 2023 the temperature was 1.75 °C above pre-industrial level and during the entire year of 2023 is expected to be 1.4 °C above it.

== General techniques and accuracy ==
By far the best observed period is from 1850 to the present day, with coverage improving over time. Over this period the recent instrumental record, mainly based on direct thermometer readings, has approximately global coverage. It shows a general warming in global temperatures.

Before this time various proxies must be used. These proxies are less accurate than direct thermometer measurements, have lower temporal resolution, and have less spatial coverage. Their only advantage is that they enable a longer record to be reconstructed. Since the direct temperature record is more accurate than the proxies (indeed, it is needed to calibrate them) it is used when available: i.e., from 1850 onwards.

=== Quantitative methods using proxy data ===
As there are few instrumental records before 1850, temperatures before then must be reconstructed based on proxy methods. One such method, based on principles of dendroclimatology, uses the width and other characteristics of tree rings to infer temperature. The isotopic composition of snow, corals, and stalactites can also be used to infer temperature. Other techniques which have been used include examining records of the time of crop harvests, the treeline in various locations, and other historical records to make inferences about the temperature. These proxy reconstructions are indirect inferences of temperature and thus tend to have greater uncertainty than instrumental data.

Most proxy records have to be calibrated against local temperature records during their period of overlap, to estimate the relationship between temperature and the proxy. The longer history of the proxy is then used to reconstruct temperature from earlier periods.

Proxy records must be averaged in some fashion if a global or hemispheric record is desired. The "Composite Plus Scaling" (CPS) method is widely used for large-scale multiproxy reconstructions of hemispheric or global average temperatures. This is complemented by Climate Field Reconstruction (CFR) methods which show how climate patterns have developed over large spatial areas.

Considerable care must be taken in the averaging process; for example, if a certain region has a large number of tree ring records, a simple average of all the data would strongly over-weight that region, and statistical techniques are used to avoid such over-weighting. In the Mann, Bradley & Hughes 1998 and Mann, Bradley & Hughes 1999 CFR reconstructions, principal components analysis was used to combine some of these regional records before they were globally combined. An important distinction is between so-called 'multi-proxy' reconstructions, which attempt to obtain a global temperature reconstruction by using multiple proxy records distributed over the globe and more regional reconstructions. Usually, the various proxy records are combined arithmetically, in some weighted average. More recently, Osborn and Briffa used a simpler technique, counting the proportion of records that are positive, negative or neutral in any time period. This produces a result in general agreement with the conventional multi-proxy studies.

The 2007 IPCC Fourth Assessment Report cited 14 reconstructions, 10 of which covered 1,000 years or longer, to support its conclusion that "Average Northern Hemisphere temperatures during the second half of the 20th century were very likely higher than during any other 50-year period in the last 500 years and likely the highest in at least the past 1,300 years".

=== Qualitative reconstruction using historical records ===
It is also possible to use historical data such as times of grape harvests, sea-ice-free periods in harbours and diary entries of frost or heatwaves to produce indications of when it was warm or cold in particular regions. These records are harder to calibrate, are often only available sparsely through time, may be available only from developed regions, and are unlikely to come with good error estimates. These historical observations of the same time period show periods of both warming and cooling.

=== Limitations ===
The apparent differences between the quantitative and qualitative approaches are not fully reconciled. The reconstructions mentioned above rely on various assumptions to generate their results. If these assumptions do not hold, the reconstructions would be unreliable. For quantitative reconstructions, the most fundamental assumptions are that proxy records vary with temperature and that non-temperature factors do not confound the results. In the historical records temperature fluctuations may be regional rather than hemispheric in scale.

In a letter to Nature Bradley, Hughes & Mann (2006) pointed at the original title of their 1998 article: Northern Hemisphere temperatures during the past millennium: inferences, uncertainties, and limitations and pointed out more widespread high-resolution data are needed before more confident conclusions can be reached and that the uncertainties were the point of the article.

== History ==
In the 1960s, Hubert Lamb generalised from historical documents and temperature records of central England to propose a Medieval Warm Period in the North Atlantic region, followed by Little Ice Age. This was discussed in the IPCC First Assessment Report with cautions that the medieval warming might not have been global. Using proxy indicators for quantitative estimates of past temperature record had developed sporadically from the 1930s onwards, and Bradley & Jones 1993 introduced the "Composite Plus Scaling" (CPS) method. Their reconstruction back to 1400 featured in the IPCC Second Assessment Report.

The Michael E. Mann, Raymond S. Bradley and Malcolm K. Hughes reconstruction (Mann, Bradley & Hughes 1998, MBH98) showed global patterns of annual surface temperature, and average hemispheric temperatures back to 1400 with emphasising on uncertainties.

Jones et al. 1998 independently produced a CPS reconstruction extending back for a thousand years, and Mann, Bradley & Hughes 1999 (MBH99) used the MBH98 methodology to extend their study back to 1000. The term hockey stick was used by the climatologist Jerry Mahlman to describe the pattern this showed, envisaging a graph that is relatively flat to 1900 as forming an ice hockey stick's "shaft", followed by a sharp increase corresponding to the "blade".

A version of the MBH99 graph was featured prominently in the 2001 IPCC Third Assessment Report (TAR), which also drew on Jones et al. 1998 and three other reconstructions to support the conclusion that, in the Northern Hemisphere, the 1990s was likely to have been the warmest decade and 1998 the warmest year during the past 1,000 years. The graph was featured in publicity, and became a focus of dispute for those opposed to the strengthening scientific consensus that late 20th century warmth was exceptional.

In 2003, as lobbying over the 1997 Kyoto Protocol intensified, efforts by the Bush administration to remove climate reconstructions from the first Environmental Protection Agency and Jim Inhofe's Senate speech claiming that man-made global warming is a hoax both drew on the Soon and Baliunas controversy. Later in 2003, Stephen McIntyre and Ross McKitrick published McIntyre & McKitrick 2003 disputing data in the MBH98 paper, but their argument was refuted. In 2004 Hans von Storch said that the MBH98 statistical techniques understated variability, but he erred in saying this undermined the overall graph. In 2005 McIntyre and McKitrick criticised the principal components analysis methodology in MBH98 and MBH99, but Huybers 2005 and Wahl & Ammann 2007 pointed to errors made by McIntyre and McKitrick. The National Research Council North Report in 2006 supported MBH with minor caveats. The Wegman Report supported McIntyre and McKitrick's study, but was subsequently discredited. Arguments against the MBH studies were reintroduced as part of the Climatic Research Unit email controversy, but dismissed by eight independent investigations.

The test in science is whether findings can be replicated using different data and methods. More than two dozen reconstructions, using various statistical methods and combinations of proxy records, have supported the broad consensus shown in the original 1998 hockey-stick graph, with variations in how flat the pre-20th century "shaft" appears. The IPCC Fifth Assessment Report (AR5 WG1) of 2013 examined temperature variations during the last two millennia, and concluded that for average annual Northern Hemisphere temperatures, "the period 1983–2012 was very likely the warmest 30-year period of the last 800 years (high confidence) and likely the warmest 30-year period of the last 1400 years (medium confidence)".

== See also ==
- CLIWOC - Climatological database for the world's oceans
- Dendroclimatology
- Table of historic and prehistoric climate indicators
