= Geoscientist (magazine) =

Geoscientist is a quarterly magazine produced for the Fellowship of the Geological Society of London. The magazine was first published in 1990. It is editorially independent of the Geological Society's administration. It has a print run of 10,000 and is freely available to all Fellows. It is also freely available online to all.

== See also ==
- Earth science
