= Raymond S. Bradley =

American climatologist

Raymond S. Bradley is a climatologist and Distinguished Professor in the Department of Earth, Geographic and Climate Sciences, School of Earth and Sustainability at the University of Massachusetts Amherst. Bradley's work indicates that the warming of Earth's climate system in the twentieth century is inexplicable via natural mechanisms.

== Early Life and Academic Career ==
Ray Bradley was born on Merseyside in the north of England and grew up in the industrial town of Ellesmere Port. He attended the first Grammar School in that town, and then went on to Southampton University (U.K.). He pursued his post-graduate studies (M.S. and Ph.D.) at the Institute of Arctic and Alpine Research, University of Colorado, Boulder (U.S.A). Later on, he also earned a D.Sc. from Southampton University, for his research contributions in paleoclimatology. He started teaching at the University of Massachusetts in 1973, and later became Head of the Department of Geosciences, a Life Member of Clare Hall, Cambridge University, and a Visiting Professor at the University of Bergen, Norway. In 2015, he received the Zuckerberg Leadership Chair from the University of Massachusetts Foundation. He is currently a Distinguished Research Professor in the School of Earth and Sustainability at the University of Massachusetts, Amherst.

Bradley has been an advisor to various government and international agencies, including the U.S., Swiss, Swedish, Finnish, German and U.K. National Science Foundations, the U.S. National Oceanic and Atmospheric Administration (NOAA), the National Research Council, the Inter-Governmental Panel on Climate Change (IPCC), the US-Russia Working Group on Environmental Protection, and the International Geosphere-Biosphere Program (IGBP). His research has been supported primarily by the National Science Foundation, the Department of Energy, NOAA, NASA and the National Geographic Society. He is currently a host scientist at UMass, Amherst for the World Climate Research Programme's International Project Office for Climate and the Cryosphere (WCRP-CliC).

Bradley has given many TV and radio interviews, speaking about climate change, global warming, and global environmental changes. He has also given talks to a wide range of audiences at venues in China, Japan, Dubai, England, Switzerland, France, Germany, Spain, Sweden, Norway, Finland, Canada, Chile, New Zealand, Argentina and the United States, and is often available for public speaking engagements.

== Research Interests ==
Bradley's research interests are in climatology and paleoclimatology, with a particular focus on how climate has changed since the last ice age. He has worked extensively in the Arctic — on Ellesmere and Cornwallis Island in the Canadian High Arctic, northern, southern and southeastern Greenland, the Faroe Islands, northwestern Norway and Svalbard. His research has also involved fieldwork in Venezuela, Peru, Bolivia, Tanzania and China. He has particularly focused on climate variability over recent centuries and millennia, using instrumental and proxy records (natural archives) of past climate, making major contributions to our understanding of climate change over the last few centuries. His research has made it clear that recent changes in climate are well outside the envelope of natural variability that the earth has experienced over recent millennia. His research on forcing factors has helped to identify the natural factors that caused climates to vary in the past, thereby clarifying the important effects that humans have had on climate in recent decades.

== Honors and awards ==
Bradley has been awarded honorary degrees (D.Sc honoris causa) from Lancaster University (U.K.), Queen's University (Canada) and the University of Bern (Switzerland). He is a Fellow of the Royal Society of Canada, the American Geophysical Union, the American Association for the Advancement of Science and the Arctic Institute of North America. He was also elected as a Foreign Member of the Finnish Academy of Science and Letters, and Academia Europaea, the European Academy of Science. In 2007, he received the Oeschger Medal of the European Geosciences Union and in 2025 he received a Chinese Academy of Sciences President’s International Distinguished Scientist Fellowship.

== Academic research: books and papers ==
Bradley has written or edited fourteen books on climatic change including "Paleoclimatology: Reconstructing Climates of the Quaternary" (3rd edition, 2014) [Elsevier/Academic Press, San Diego; ISBN 9780123869135, which won a 2015 Award from the Text and Academic Authors Association. A Chinese translation was published in 2025 (Elsevier/China Science Press). His other books include, "The Hadley Circulation, Present, Past and Future" (eds. H.F. Diaz, and R.S. Bradley, 2004. Kluwer Academic, Dordrecht); "Paleoclimate, Global Change and the Future" (eds. K. Alverson, R.S. Bradley and T.F. Pedersen, 2003; Springer, Berlin); "Climate Change and Society" (R.S. Bradley and N.E. Law, 2001, Stanley Thornes, Cheltenham, U.K.); "Climate Variations and Forcing Mechanisms of the Last 2000 years" (eds. P.D. Jones, R.S. Bradley and J. Jouzel, 1996. Springer, Berlin), and "Climate Since A.D. 1500" (eds. R.S. Bradley and P.D. Jones, 1995. Routledge, London). His latest book, "Climate After Net Zero: The New Normal" will be published by Elsevier/Academic Press in late 2026.

In addition to his many books, Bradley has authored/co-authored more than 220 peer-reviewed articles on climate change, covering a wide range of topics. He has maintained a particular focus on the climate of the Arctic, and of mountainous areas, reflecting his long-standing interests in those regions. Bradley was a contributing author to the IPCC TAR , and worked on reconstructing the temperature record of the past 1000 years with Michael E. Mann and Malcolm K. Hughes, a dendroclimatologist. This work received a disproportionate amount of attention after figuring prominently in the IPCC TAR SPM. In 2005, the Chair of the US House of Representatives Committee on Energy and Commerce, Rep. Joe Barton (R-Texas) demanded that Bradley provide a detailed accounting of the data and funding of his research on climate change. Bradley responded (in terms that provide a clear explanation of the issues involved for the public at large), in his book, "Global Warming and Political Intimidation", 2011, University of Massachusetts Press, Amherst, (also available in a Japanese translation [2012] by Kagaku Dojin, Tokyo). As for the hockey stick story, Bradley recommends a commentary by Gavin Schmidt on the RealClimate website (Gavin Schmidt (18 February 2005). "Dummies guide to the latest "Hockey Stick" controversy".) which provides a very clear overview of the issues.
