= Malcolm K. Hughes =

British climatologist

- Born: Matlock, Derbyshire, United Kingdom
- Education: Durham University (PhD)
- Known for: Hockey stick graph
- Scientific career
- Fields: Dendrochronology; Paleoclimate; Tree biology Forest ecology
- Workplaces: University of Arizona
- Thesis: Investigations of the ecosystem energetics of an English woodland (1969)
- Website: ltrr.arizona.edu/people/hughes

Malcolm K. Hughes is a meso-climatologist and Regents' Professor of Dendrochronology in the Laboratory for Tree-Ring Research at the University of Arizona.

== Education and early life ==
Hughes was born in Matlock, Derbyshire, England, and earned a Ph.D in ecology from the University of Durham.

== Career and research ==
Since 1998, he is a fellow of the American Geophysical Union. His research is on the nature of climate variability, specifically focusing on the timescales of years to centuries. He uses natural recorded records such as tree rings.

Hughes has studied geographical areas including Europe, Asia, and the Sierra Nevada. In addition to tree rings, Hughes uses ice cores, laminated sediments, and the historical temperature record to help understand past climates. In 1998, he was a co-author with Michael E. Mann and Raymond S. Bradley on a paper which produced the first eigenvector-based climate field reconstruction (CFR) incorporating multiple climate proxy data sets of different types and lengths into a high-resolution reconstruction of northern hemisphere temperatures. In 1999 the same team extended the method to cover 1,000 years, producing what was dubbed the hockey stick graph.
