= Nuremberg Laws =

Nazi Germany antisemitic and racist laws

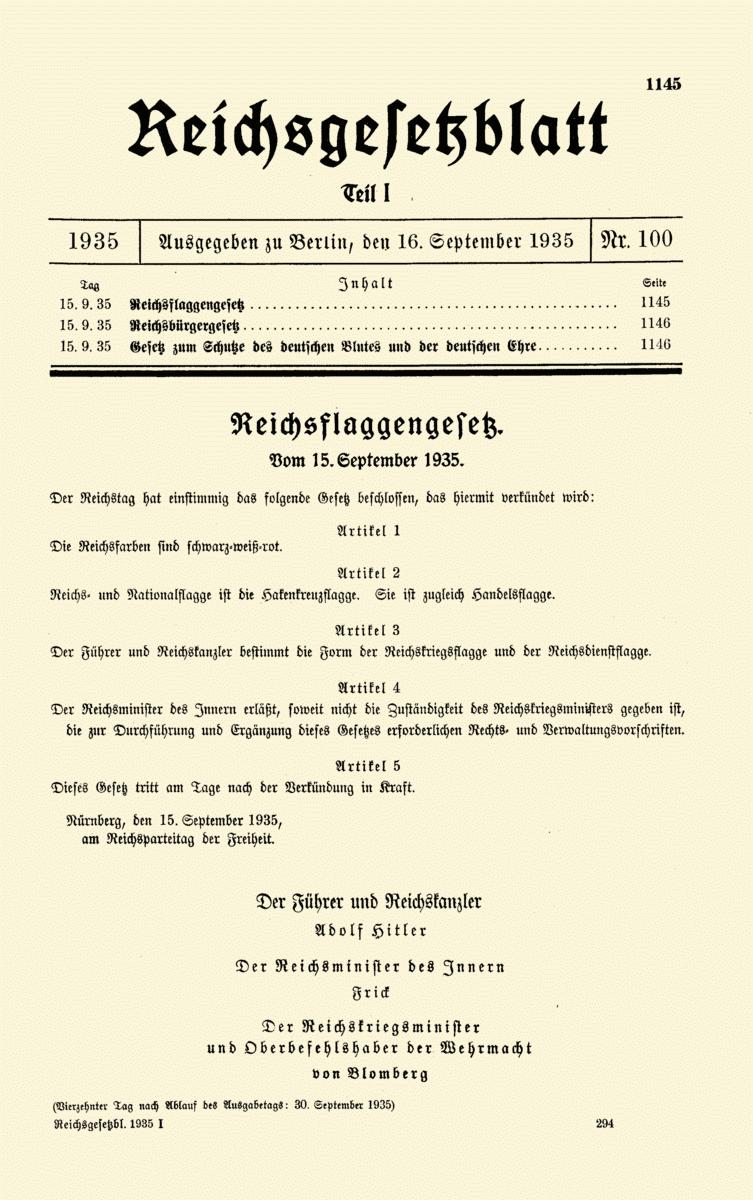
Title page of the German government gazette Reichsgesetzblatt issue proclaiming the laws, published on 16 September 1935 (RGBl. I No. 100)

The Nuremberg Laws (Nürnberger Gesetze, pronounced [ˈnʏʁnbɛʁɡɐ ɡəˈzɛtsə]) were antisemitic and racist laws introduced in Nazi Germany on 15 September 1935 at a special session of the Reichstag during the annual Nuremberg Rally of the Nazi Party. The legislation comprised two measures. The Law for the Protection of German Blood and German Honour prohibited marriages and sexual relations between Jews and Germans and barred Jewish households from employing German women under the age of 45. The Reich Citizenship Law restricted citizenship to people of "German or related blood", reducing others to state subjects without full rights.

A supplementary decree issued on 14 November 1935 defined who was legally considered Jewish and brought the Reich Citizenship Law into effect. On 26 November, further regulations extended the measures to "Gypsies, Negroes, and their bastards", classifying them with Jews as "enemies of the race-based state".

To avoid international criticism, prosecutions under the laws were delayed until after the 1936 Summer Olympics in Berlin. The enactment followed earlier antisemitic policies of the regime. In 1933, Hitler's government declared a boycott of Jewish businesses, excluded Jews and other so-called "non-Aryans" from public service through the Law for the Restoration of the Professional Civil Service, and organised book burnings of works by Jewish and other authors. Jewish citizens were increasingly subjected to harassment, violence, and loss of rights.

The Nuremberg Laws severely damaged the Jewish community's social and economic position. People convicted of violating the marriage laws were imprisoned and, from March 1938, often re-arrested by the Gestapo and sent to Nazi concentration camps. Social and commercial contact between Jews and non-Jews declined, and many Jewish-owned businesses closed. Jews were excluded from civil service posts and regulated professions such as medicine and teaching, forcing many into menial work. Emigration was obstructed by the Reich Flight Tax, which seized up to 90 per cent of a person's assets. By 1938, few countries were willing to accept Jewish refugees. Plans for mass resettlement, such as the Madagascar Plan, failed, and from 1941 the regime began the Final Solution, the systematic extermination of Europe's Jews.

== Background ==
The Nazi Party was one of several far-right political parties which were active in Germany after the end of the First World War. The party platform included removal of the Weimar Republic, rejection of the terms of the Treaty of Versailles, radical antisemitism, and anti-Bolshevism. They promised a strong central government, increased Lebensraum ('living space') for Germanic peoples, formation of a Volksgemeinschaft ('people's community') based on race, and racial cleansing via the active suppression of Jews, who would be stripped of their citizenship and civil rights.

While he was imprisoned in 1924 after the failed Beer Hall Putsch, Hitler dictated Mein Kampf to his deputy, Rudolf Hess. The book is an autobiography and exposition of Hitler's ideology in which he laid out his plans for transforming German society into one based on race. In it, he outlined his belief in Jewish Bolshevism, a conspiracy theory that posited the existence of an international Jewish conspiracy for world domination in which the Jews were the mortal enemy of the German people. Throughout his life, Hitler never wavered in his worldview as expounded in Mein Kampf. The Nazi Party advocated the concept of a Volksgemeinschaft with the aim of uniting all Germans as national comrades, whilst excluding those deemed either to be community aliens or of a foreign race (Fremdvölkische).

== Nazi Germany ==
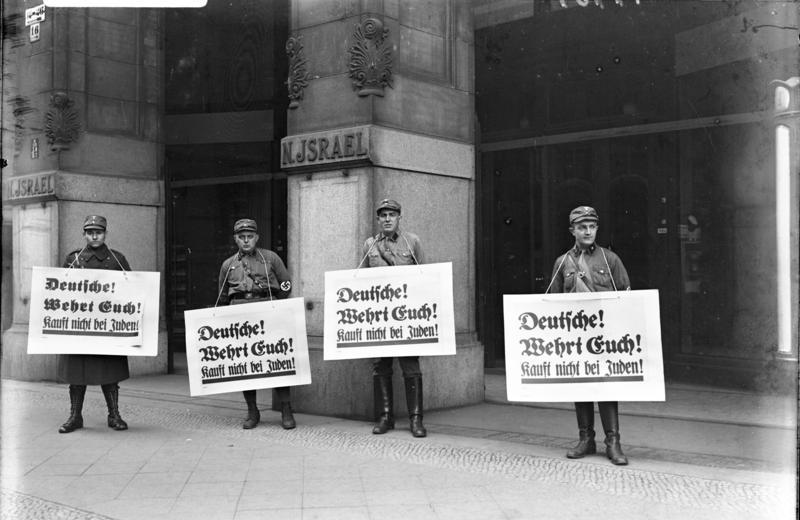
Members of the SA picketing in front of a Jewish place of business with placards saying "Germans! Defend yourselves! Don't buy from Jews!" during the Nazi boycott of Jewish businesses, 1 April 1933

Discrimination against Jews intensified after the Nazis came into power; a month-long series of attacks by members of the Sturmabteilung (SA; paramilitary wing of the Nazi Party) on Jewish businesses, synagogues, and members of the legal profession followed. On 21 March 1933, former U.S. congressman William W. Cohen, at a meeting of the executive advisory committee of the Jewish War Veterans of the United States, urged a strict boycott against all German goods. Later that month, a worldwide boycott of German goods was declared, with the support of several prominent Jewish organisations (though with the abstention of others, such as the Board of Deputies of British Jews). In response, Hitler declared a national boycott of Jewish businesses on 1 April 1933. By that time, many people who were not Nazi Party members were advocating the segregation of Jews from the rest of German society. The Law for the Restoration of the Professional Civil Service, passed on 7 April 1933, forced all non-Aryans to retire from the legal profession and civil service. Similar legislation soon deprived Jewish members of other professions of their right to practice. It also barred Jews from teaching at universities. In 1934, the Nazi Party published a pamphlet titled "Warum Arierparagraph?" ('Why the Aryan Law?'), which summarised the perceived need for the law. As part of the drive to remove what the Nazis called "Jewish influence" from cultural life, members of the National Socialist Student League removed from libraries any books considered un-German, and a nationwide book burning was held on 10 May. Violence and economic pressure were used by the regime to encourage Jews to voluntarily leave the country. Legislation passed in July 1933 stripped naturalised German Jews of their citizenship, creating a legal basis for recent immigrants (particularly Eastern European Jews) to be deported. Many towns posted signs forbidding entry to Jews. Throughout 1933 and 1934, Jewish businesses were denied access to markets, they were forbidden to advertise in newspapers, and they were deprived of access to government contracts. Citizens were harassed and subjected to violent attacks.

Other laws which were promulgated during this period included the Law for the Prevention of Hereditarily Diseased Offspring (passed on 14 July 1933), which called for the compulsory sterilisation of people with a range of hereditary, physical, and mental illnesses. Under the Law against Dangerous Habitual Criminals (passed 24 November 1933), habitual criminals were forced to undergo sterilisation as well. This law was also used to force the incarceration in prison or Nazi concentration camps of "social misfits" such as the chronically unemployed, prostitutes, beggars, alcoholics, homeless vagrants, Black people, and Romani (referred to as Zigeuner "Gypsies").

=== Reich Gypsy Law ===
The Central Office for Combatting Gypsies was established in 1929, under the Weimar Republic. In December 1938 Reichsführer-SS Heinrich Himmler issued an order for "combatting the Gypsy plague". Romani people were to be categorised in terms of their Roma ancestry as a racial characteristic, rather than in terms of their previous characterisation as an anti-social element of society. This work was advanced by Robert Ritter of the Racial Hygiene and Population unit of the Ministry of Health, who by 1942, had produced a scale of ZM+, ZM of the first and second degree, and ZM- to reflect an individual's decreasing level of Romani ancestry. This classification meant that one could be classified as Roma and subject to anti-Roma legislation based on having two Roma great-great-grandparents. According to the Ministry of the Interior, the "Gypsy problem" could not be dealt with by forced resettlement or imprisonment within Germany, so they prepared a draft of a Reich "Gypsy Law" intended to supplement and accompany the Nuremberg Laws. The draft recommended identification and registration of all Roma, followed by sterilisation and deportation. In 1938, public health authorities were ordered to register all Roma and Roma Mischlinge. Despite Himmler's interest in enacting such legislation, which he said would prevent "further intermingling of blood, and which regulates all the most pressing questions which go together with the existences of Gypsies in the living space of the German nation", the regime never promulgated the "Gypsy Law". In December 1942, Himmler ordered that all Roma were to be sent to Nazi concentration camps.

=== "Jewish problem" ===
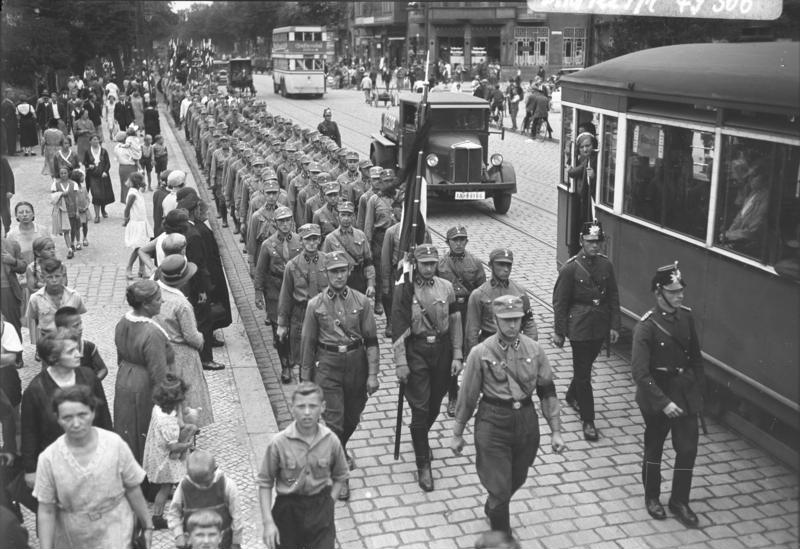
The SA had nearly three million members at the start of 1934.

Disenchanted with the unfulfilled promise of Nazi Party leaders to eliminate Jews from German society, SA members were eager to lash out against the Jewish minority as a way of expressing their frustrations. A Gestapo report from early 1935 stated that the rank and file of the Nazi Party would set in motion a solution to the "Jewish problem ... from below that the government would then have to follow". Assaults, vandalism, and boycotts against Jews, which the Nazi government had temporarily curbed in 1934, increased again in 1935 amidst a propaganda campaign authorised at the highest levels of government. Most non-party members ignored the boycotts and objected to the violence out of concern for their own safety. Israeli historian Otto Dov Kulka argues that there was a disparity between the views of the Alte Kämpfer (longtime party members) and the general public, but that even those Germans who were not politically active favoured bringing in tougher new antisemitic laws in 1935. The matter was raised to the forefront of the state agenda as a result of this antisemitic agitation.

Interior Minister Wilhelm Frick announced on 25 July that a law forbidding marriages between Jews and non-Jews would shortly be promulgated, and recommended that registrars should avoid issuing licences for such marriages for the time being. The draft law also called for a ban on marriage for persons with hereditary illnesses.

Hjalmar Schacht, Economics Minister and Reichsbank president, criticised the violent behaviour of the Alte Kämpfer and SA because of its negative impact on the economy. The violence also had a negative impact on Germany's reputation in the international community. For these reasons, Hitler ordered a stop to "individual actions" against German Jews on 8 August 1935, and Frick threatened to take legal action against Nazi Party members who ignored the order. From Hitler's perspective, it was imperative to quickly bring in new antisemitic laws to appease the radical elements in the party who persisted in attempting to remove the Jews from German society by violent means. A conference of ministers was held on 20 August 1935 to discuss the question. Hitler argued against violent methods because of the damage being done to the economy and insisted the matter must be settled through legislation. The focus of the new laws would be marriage laws to prevent "racial defilement", stripping Jews of their German citizenship, and laws to prevent Jews from participating freely in the economy.

=== Events in Nuremberg ===
The seventh annual Nazi Party rally, held in Nuremberg from 10 to 16 September 1935, featured the only Reichstag session held outside Berlin during the Nazi regime. Hitler decided that the rally would be a good opportunity to introduce the long-awaited anti-Jewish laws. In a speech on 12 September, leading Nazi physician Gerhard Wagner announced that the government would soon introduce a "law for the protection of German blood". The next day, Hitler summoned the Reichstag to meet in session at Nuremberg on 15 September, the last day of the rally. He then spoke with Hans Pfundtner, State Secretary in the Reich Interior Ministry, and Wilhelm Stuckart, a Ministerial Counselor, instructing them to draft a law forbidding sexual relations or marriages between Jews and non-Jews. They, in turn, summoned Franz Albrecht Medicus and Bernhard Lösener of the Interior Ministry to Nuremberg to assist with the hurried drafting of the legislation. The two men arrived on 14 September. That evening, Hitler ordered them to also have ready by morning a draft of the Reich citizenship law. Hitler found the initial drafts of the Blood Law to be too lenient, so at around midnight Frick brought him four new drafts that differed mainly in the severity of the penalties they imposed. Hitler chose the most lenient version but left vague the definition of who was a Jew. Hitler stated at the rally that the laws were "an attempt at the legal settlement of a problem, which, if this proved a failure, would have to be entrusted by law to the National Socialist Party for a definitive solution". Propaganda Minister Joseph Goebbels had the radio broadcast of the passing of the laws cut short, and ordered the German media to not mention them until a decision was made as to how they would be implemented.

== Text of the laws ==
Nuremberg Race Laws

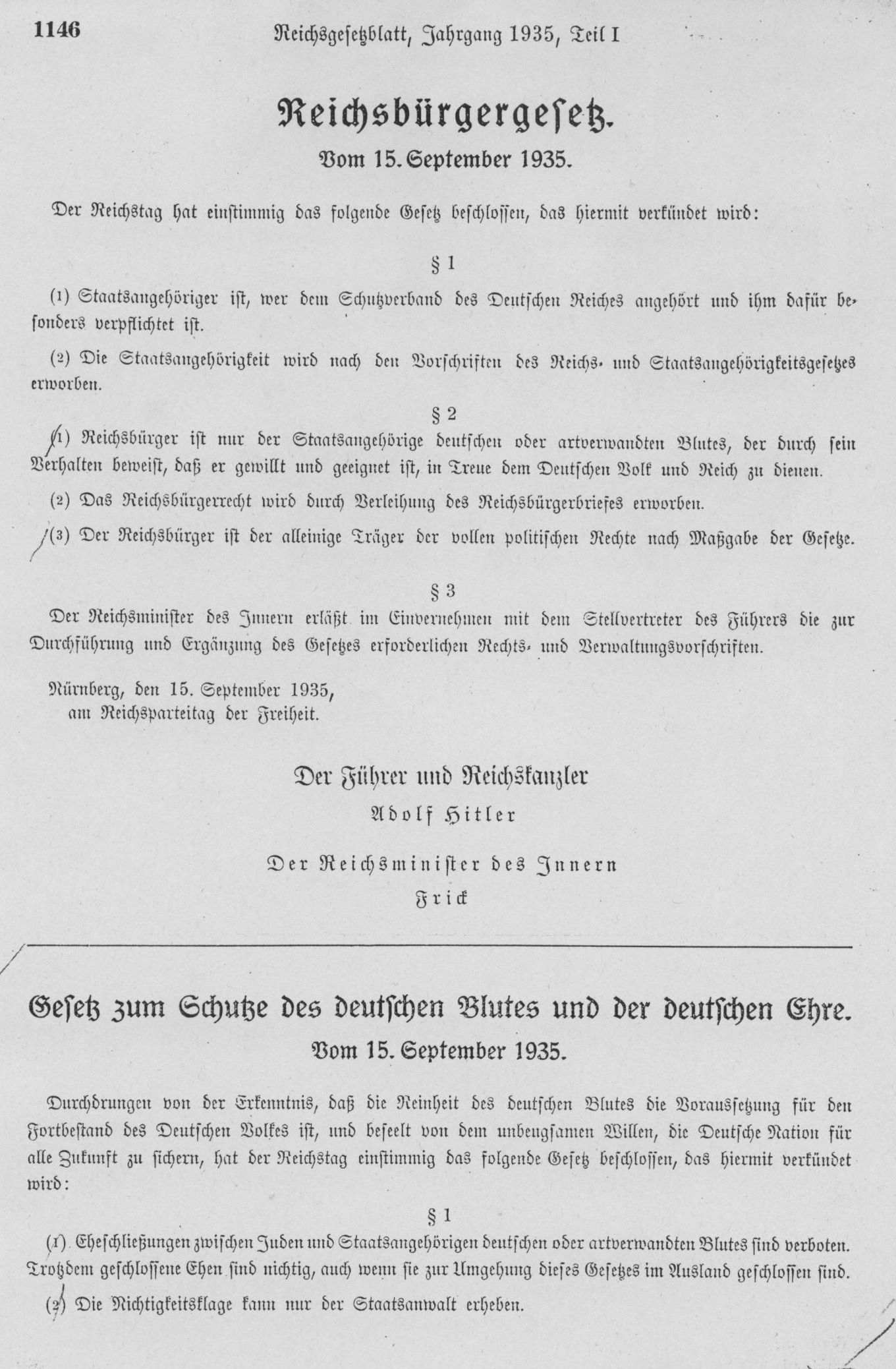
Reich Citizenship Law

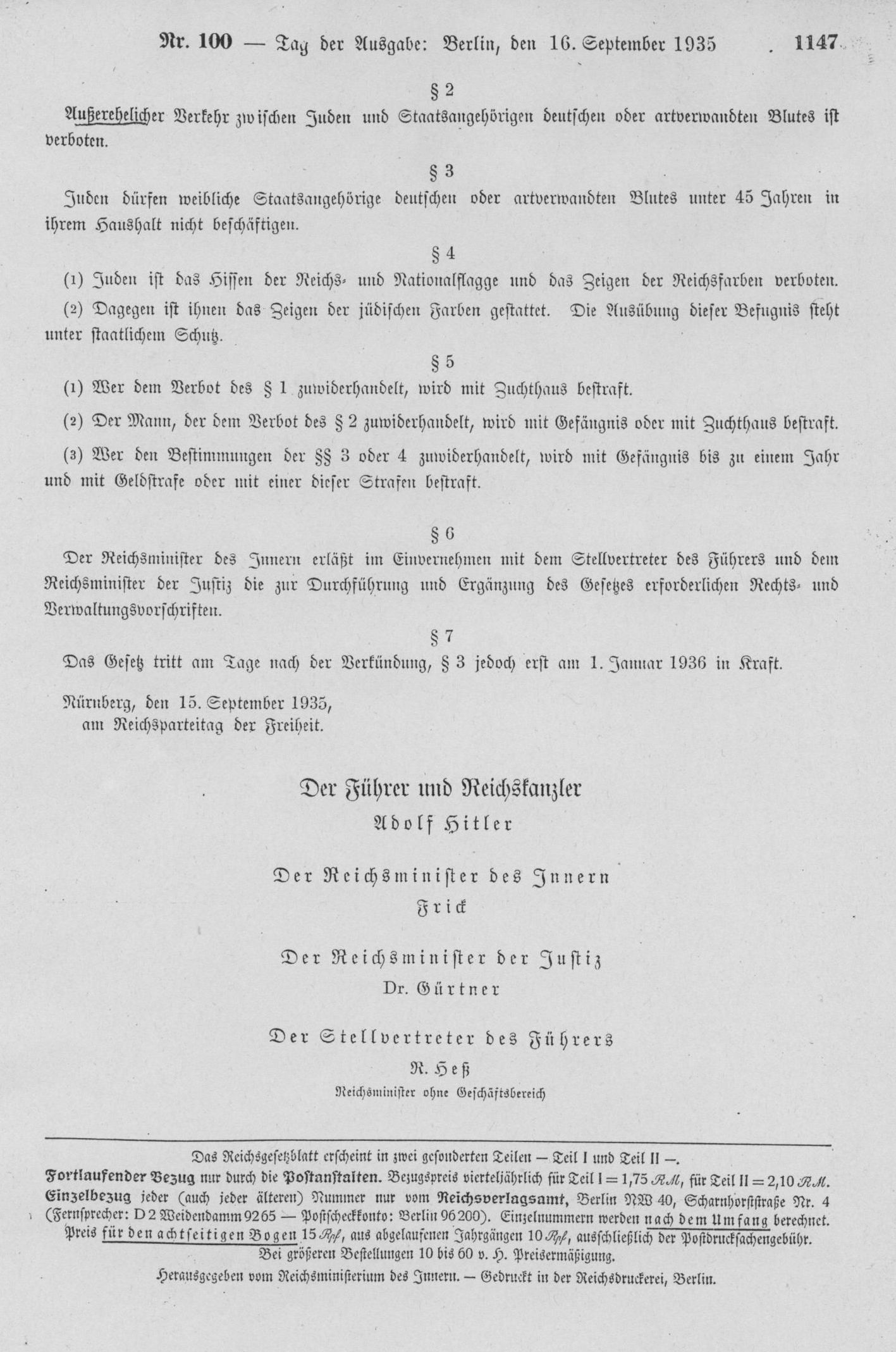
Law for the Protection of German Blood and German Honour

The two Nuremberg Laws were unanimously passed by the Reichstag on 15 September 1935. The Law for the Protection of German Blood and German Honour prohibited marriages and extramarital intercourse between Jews and Germans, and forbade the employment of German females under 45 in Jewish households. The Reich Citizenship Law declared that only those of German or related blood were eligible to be Reich citizens; the remainder were classed as state subjects, without citizenship rights. The wording in the Citizenship Law that a person must prove "by his conduct that he is willing and fit to faithfully serve the German people and Reich" meant that political opponents could also be stripped of their German citizenship. This law was effectively a means of stripping Jews, Roma, and other "undesirables" of their legal rights and their citizenship.

Over the coming years, an additional 13 supplementary laws were promulgated that further marginalised the Jewish community in Germany. For example, Jewish families were not permitted to submit claims for subsidies for large families and were forbidden to transact business with Aryans.

Translations of the laws below are provided by the United States Holocaust Memorial Museum.

=== Reich Citizenship Law ===
German	English
Reichsbürgergesetz	Reich Citizenship Law
Der Reichstag hat einstimmig das folgende Gesetz beschlossen, das hiermit verkündet wird:	The Reichstag has unanimously enacted the following law, which is promulgated herewith:
§1 (1) Staatsangehöriger ist, wer dem Schutzverband des Deutschen Reiches angehört und ihm dafür besonders verpflichtet ist. (2) Die Staatsangehörigkeit wird nach den Vorschriften des Reichs- und Staatsangehörigkeitsgesetzes erworben.	§1 (1) A subject of the state is a person who enjoys the protection of the German Reich and who in consequence has specific obligations toward it. (2) The status of subject of the state is acquired in accordance with the provisions of the Reich and the Reich Citizenship Law.
§2 (1) Reichsbürger ist nur der Staatsangehörige deutschen oder artverwandten Blutes, der durch sein Verhalten beweist, daß er gewillt und geeignet ist, in Treue dem Deutschen Volk und Reich zu dienen. (2) Das Reichsbürgerrecht wird durch Verleihung des Reichsbürgerbriefes erworben. (3) Der Reichsbürger ist der alleinige Träger der vollen politischen Rechte nach Maßgabe der Gesetze.	§2 (1) A Reich citizen is a subject of the state who is of German or related blood, and proves by his conduct that he is willing and fit to faithfully serve the German people and Reich. (2) Reich citizenship is acquired through the granting of a Reich citizenship certificate. (3) The Reich citizen is the sole bearer of full political rights in accordance with the law.
§3; Der Reichsminister des Innern erläßt im Einvernehmen mit dem Stellvertreter des Führers die zur Durchführung und Ergänzung des Gesetzes erforderlichen Rechts- und Verwaltungsvorschriften.	§3; The Reich Minister of the Interior, in coordination with the Deputy of the Führer, will issue the legal and administrative orders required to implement and complete this law.

=== Law for the Protection of German Blood and German Honor ===
German	English
Gesetz zum Schutze des deutschen Blutes und der deutschen Ehre	Law for the Protection of German Blood and German Honor
Durchdrungen von der Erkenntnis, daß die Reinheit des deutschen Blutes die Voraussetzung für den Fortbestand des Deutschen Volkes ist, und beseelt von dem unbeugsamen Willen, die Deutsche Nation für alle Zukunft zu sichern, hat der Reichstag einstimmig das folgende Gesetz beschlossen, das hiermit verkündet wird:	Moved by the understanding that purity of German blood is the essential condition for the continued existence of the German people, and inspired by the inflexible determination to ensure the existence of the German nation for all time, the Reichstag has unanimously adopted the following law, which is promulgated herewith:
§1 (1) Eheschließungen zwischen Juden und Staatsangehörigen deutschen oder artverwandten Blutes sind verboten. Trotzdem geschlossene Ehen sind nichtig, auch wenn sie zur Umgehung dieses Gesetzes im Ausland geschlossen wird. (2) Die Nichtigkeitsklage kann nur der Staatsanwalt erheben.	§1 (1) Marriages between Jews and citizens of German or related blood are forbidden. Marriages nevertheless concluded are invalid, even if concluded abroad to circumvent this law. (2) Annulment proceedings can be initiated only by the state prosecutor.
§2; Außerehelicher Verkehr zwischen Juden und Staatsangehörigen deutschen oder artverwandten Blutes ist verboten.	§2; Extramarital relations between Jews and citizens of German or related blood are forbidden.
§3; Juden dürfen weibliche Staatsangehörige deutschen oder artverwandten Blutes unter 45 Jahren in ihrem Haushalt nicht beschäftigen.	§3; Jews may not employ in their households female subjects of the state of Germany or related blood who are under 45 years old.
§4 (1) Juden ist das Hissen der Reichs- und Nationalflagge und das Zeigen der Reichsfarben verboten. (2) Dagegen ist ihnen das Zeigen der jüdischen Farben gestattet. Die Ausübung dieser Befugnis steht unter staatlichen Schutz.	§4 (1) Jews are forbidden to fly the Reich or national flag or display Reich colors. (2) They are, on the other hand, permitted to display the Jewish colors. The exercise of this right is protected by the state.
§5 (1) Wer dem Verbot des § 1 zuwiderhandelt, wird mit Zuchthaus bestraft. (2) Der Mann, der dem Verbot des § 2 zuwiderhandelt, wird mit Gefängnis oder mit Zuchthaus bestraft. (3) Wer den Bestimmungen der §§ 3 oder 4 zuwiderhandelt, wird mit Gefängnis bis zu einem Jahr und mit Geldstrafe oder mit einer dieser Strafen bestraft.	§5 (1) Any person who violates the prohibition under Article 1 will be punished with a prison sentence with hard labor. (2) A male who violates the prohibition under Article 2 will be punished with a jail term or a prison sentence with hard labor. (3) Any person violating the provisions under Articles 3 or 4 will be punished with a jail term of up to one year and a fine, or with one or the other of these penalties.
§6; Der Reichsminister des Innern erläßt im Einvernehmen mit dem Stellvertreter des Führers und dem Reichsminister der Justiz die zur Durchführung und Ergänzung des Gesetzes erforderlichen Rechts- und Verwaltungsvorschriften.	§6; The Reich Minister of the Interior, in coordination with the Deputy of the Führer and the Reich Minister of Justice, will issue the legal and administrative regulations required to implement and complete this law.
§7; Das Gesetz tritt am Tage nach der Verkündung, § 3 jedoch am 1. Januar 1936 in Kraft.	§7; The law takes effect on the day following promulgation, except for Article 3, which goes into force on 1 January 1936.

== Classifications under the laws ==
1935
Classification	Translation	Heritage	Definition
Deutschblütiger	German-blooded	German only	Belongs to the German race and nation; approved to have Reich citizenship
Deutschblütiger	German-blooded	1/8 Jewish	Considered as belonging to the German race and nation; approved to have Reich citizenship
Mischling zweiten Grades	Mixed race (second degree)	1/4 Jewish	Only partly belongs to the German race and nation; approved to have Reich citizenship
Mischling ersten Grades	Mixed race (first degree)	3/8 or 1/2 Jewish	Only partly belongs to the German race and nation; approved to have Reich citizenship
Jude	Jew	3/4 Jewish	Belongs to the Jewish race and community; not approved to have Reich citizenship
Jude	Jew	Jewish only	Belongs to the Jewish race and community; not approved to have Reich citizenship

Special cases with first-degree Mischlinge
Date	Decree
15 September 1935	A Mischling will be considered a Jew if they are a member of the Jewish religious community.
15 September 1935	A Mischling will be considered a Jew if they are married to a Jew. Their children will be considered Jews.
17 September 1935	A mixed-race child that is born of a marriage with a Jew, where the marriage date is after 17 September 1935, will be classified as a Jew. Those born in marriages officiated on or before 17 September 1935 will still be classified as Mischlinge.
31 July 1936	A mixed-race child originating from forbidden extramarital sexual intercourse with a Jew that is born out of wedlock after 31 July 1936 will be classified as a Jew.

== Impact ==
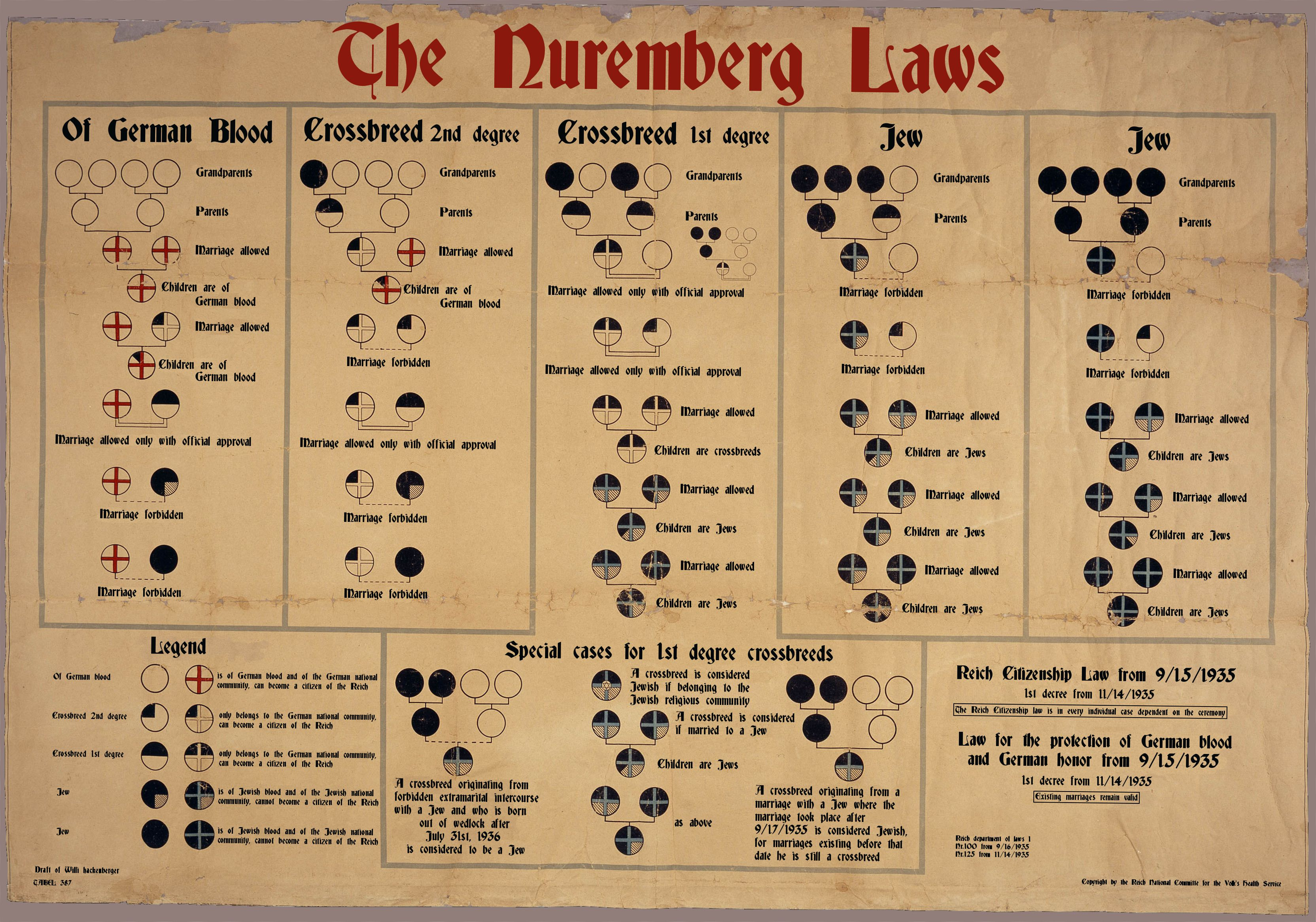
1935 chart, edited with English translations, showing racial classifications under the Nuremberg Laws: German, Mischlinge, and Jew.

While both the Interior Ministry and the Nazi Party agreed that persons with three or more Jewish grandparents would be classed as being Jewish and those with only one (Mischlinge of the second degree) would not, a debate arose as to the status of persons with two Jewish grandparents (Mischlinge of the first degree). The Nazi Party, especially its more radical elements, wanted the laws to apply to Mischlinge of both the first and second degree. For this reason Hitler continued to stall, and did not make a decision until early November 1935. His final ruling was that persons with three Jewish grandparents were classed as Jewish; those with two Jewish grandparents would be considered Jewish only if they practised the faith or had a Jewish spouse. The supplementary decree outlining the definition of who was Jewish was passed on 14 November, and the Reich Citizenship Law came into force on that date. Jews were no longer German citizens and did not have the right to vote. Jews and Gypsies were not allowed to vote in Reichstag elections or the 1938 Austrian Anschluss referendum. Civil servants who had been granted an exemption to the Law for the Restoration of the Professional Civil Service because of their status as war veterans were forced out of their jobs on this date. A supplementary decree issued on 21 December ordered the dismissal of Jewish veterans from other state-regulated professions such as medicine and education.

While Frick's suggestion that a citizenship tribunal before which every German would have to prove that they were Aryan was not acted upon, proving one's racial heritage became a necessary part of daily life. Non-government employers were authorised to include in their statutes an Aryan paragraph excluding both Mischlinge and Jews from employment. Proof of Aryan descent was achieved by obtaining an Aryan certificate. One form was to acquire an Ahnenpass, which could be obtained by providing birth or baptismal certificates that all four grandparents were of Aryan descent. The Ahnenpass could also be acquired by citizens of other countries, as long as they were of "German or related blood".

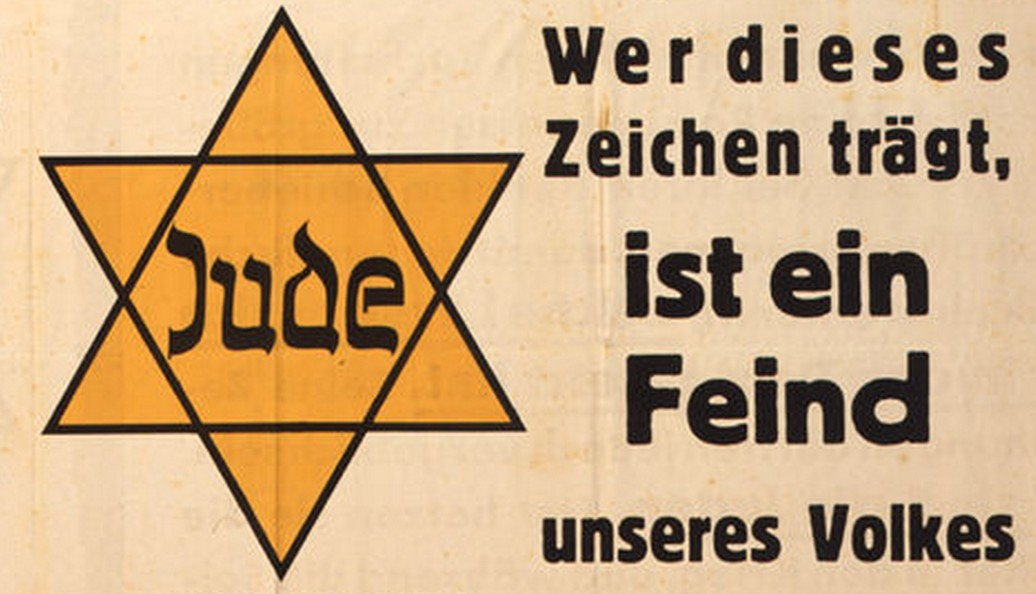
"Whoever wears this sign is an enemy of our people" – Parole der Woche, 1 July 1942

Under the Law for the Protection of German Blood and German Honour (15 September 1935), marriages were forbidden between Jews and Germans; between Mischlinge of the first degree and Germans; between Jews and Mischlinge of the second degree; and between two Mischlinge of the second degree. Mischlinge of the first degree were permitted to marry Jews, but they would henceforth be classed as Jewish themselves. All marriages undertaken between half-Jews and Germans required the approval of a Committee for the Protection of German Blood. Few such permissions were granted. A supplementary decree issued on 26 November 1935 extended the law to "Gypsies, Negroes, and their bastards".

Persons suspected of having sexual relations with non-Aryans were charged with Rassenschande ('racial defilement') and tried in the regular courts. Evidence provided to the Gestapo for such cases was largely provided by ordinary citizens such as neighbours, co-workers, or other informants. Persons accused of race defilement were publicly humiliated by being paraded through the streets with a placard around their necks detailing their crime. Those convicted were typically sentenced to prison terms, and (subsequent to 8 March 1938) upon completing their sentences were re-arrested by the Gestapo and sent to concentration camps. As the law did not permit capital punishment for racial defilement, special courts were convened to allow the death penalty for some cases. From the end of 1935 through 1940, 1,911 people were convicted of Rassenschande. Over time, the law was extended to include non-sexual forms of physical contact such as greeting someone with a kiss or an embrace.

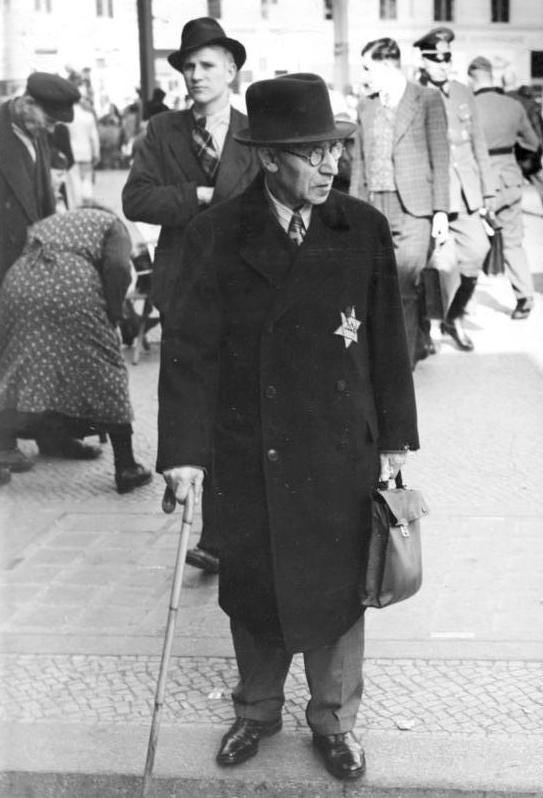
Beginning in 1941, Jews were required by law to self-identify by wearing a yellow badge on their clothing.

For the most part, Germans accepted the Nuremberg Laws, partly because Nazi propaganda had successfully swayed public opinion towards the general belief that Jews were a separate race, but also because to oppose the regime meant leaving oneself open to harassment or arrest by the Gestapo. Citizens were relieved that the antisemitic violence ceased after the laws were passed. Non-Jews gradually stopped socialising with Jews or shopping in Jewish-owned stores. Wholesalers who continued to serve Jewish merchants were marched through the streets with placards around their necks proclaiming them as traitors. The Communist Party and some elements of the Catholic Church were critical of the laws. Concerned that international opinion would be adversely swayed by the new laws, the Interior Ministry did not actively enforce them until after the 1936 Summer Olympics, held in Berlin that August.

The Interior Ministry estimated there were 750,000 Mischlinge as of April 1935 (studies done after the war put the number of Mischlinge at around 200,000). As Jews became more and more excluded from German society, they organised social events, schools, and activities of their own. Economic problems were not so easily solved, however; many Jewish firms went out of business due to lack of customers. This was part of the ongoing Aryanisation process (the transfer of Jewish firms to non-Jewish owners, usually at prices far below market value) that the regime had initiated in 1933, which intensified after the Nuremberg Laws were passed. Former middle-class or wealthy business owners were forced to take employment in menial jobs to support their families, and many were unable to find work at all.

Although a stated goal of the Nazis was that all Jews should leave the country, emigration was problematic, as Jews were required to remit up to 90 per cent of their wealth as a tax upon leaving the country. Anyone caught transferring their money overseas was sentenced to lengthy terms in prison as "economic saboteurs". An exception was money sent to Palestine under the terms of the Haavara Agreement, whereby Jews could transfer some of their assets and emigrate to that country. Around 52,000 Jews emigrated to Palestine under the terms of this agreement between 1933 and 1939.

By the start of the Second World War in 1939, around 250,000 of Germany's 437,000 Jews had emigrated to the United States, the British Mandate of Palestine, Great Britain, and other countries. By 1938 it was becoming almost impossible for potential Jewish emigrants to find a country that would take them. After the 1936–1939 Arab revolt, the British were disinclined to accept any more Jews into Palestine for fear it would further destabilise the region. Nationalistic and xenophobic people in other countries pressured their governments not to accept waves of Jewish immigrants, especially poverty-stricken ones. The Madagascar Plan, a proposed mass deportation of European Jews to Madagascar, proved to be impossible to carry out. Starting in mid-1941, the German government began resorting to mass exterminations of European Jews. The total number of Jews murdered during the resulting Holocaust is estimated at 5.5 to 6 million people. Estimates of the death toll of Romani people in the Porajmos range from 150,000 to 1,500,000.

== Legislation in other countries ==
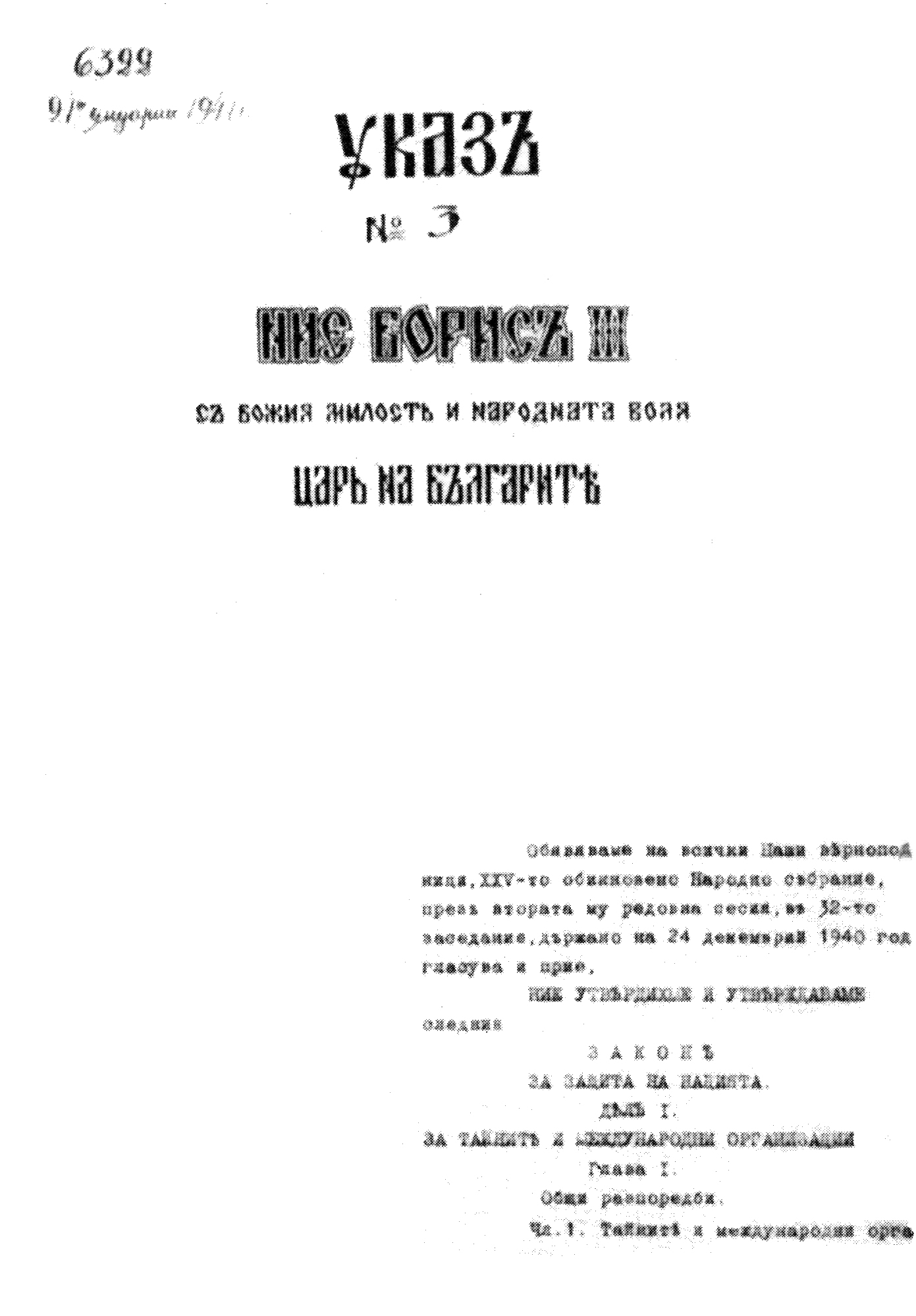
Decree of Tsar Boris III of Bulgaria for approval of the Law for Protection of the Nation

Some of the other Axis powers passed their own versions of the Nuremberg Laws.

- In 1938, Fascist Italy passed the Italian racial laws and Manifesto of Race, which stripped Jews of their citizenship and forbade sexual relations and marriages between Jewish and non-Jewish Italians.
- Hungary passed laws on 28 May 1938 and 5 May 1939 banning Jews from various professions. A third law, added in August 1941, defined Jews as anyone with at least two Jewish grandparents, and forbade sexual relations or marriages between Jews and non-Jews.
- In 1940, the ruling Iron Guard in Romania passed the Law Defining the Legal Status of Romanian Jews.
- In 1941, the Codex Judaicus was enacted in Slovakia.
- In 1941, Bulgaria passed the Law for Protection of the Nation.
- In 1941, the Ustaše in Croatia passed legislation defining who was a Jew and restricting contact with them.
- While the Empire of Japan did not draft or pass any legislation, they implemented policies targeting Jews in some occupied countries, like Indonesia and Singapore.

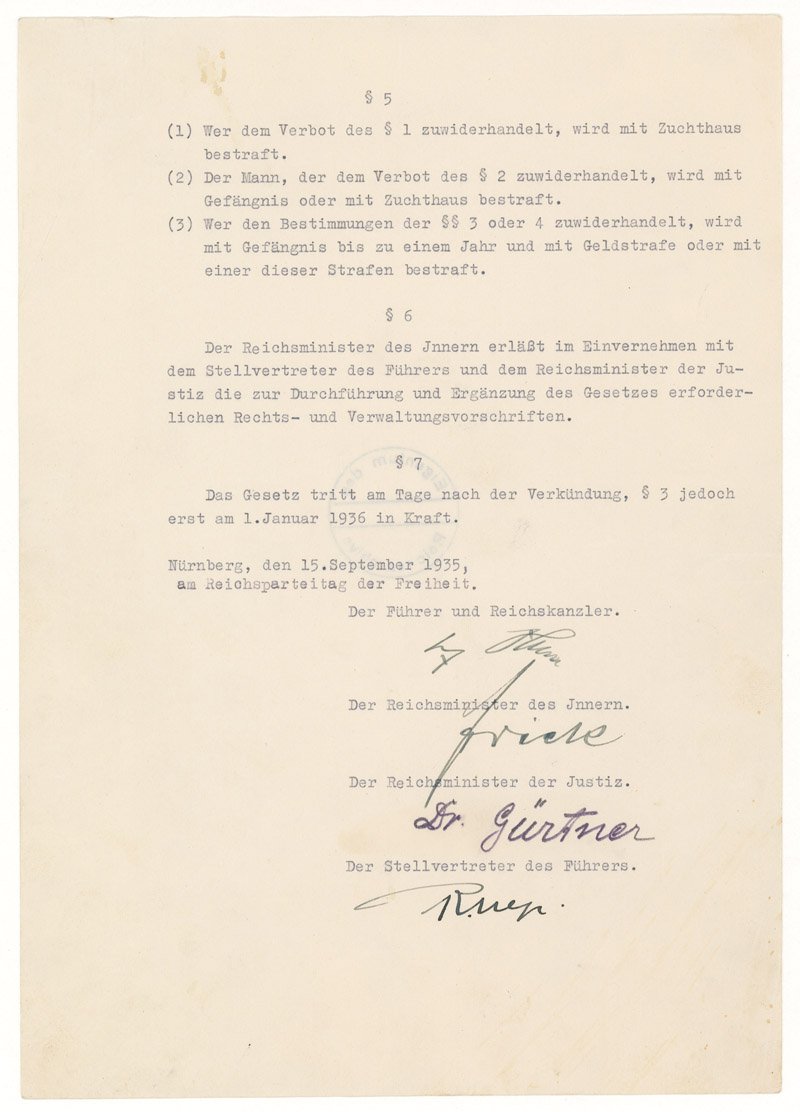
Page from the Nuremberg Laws signed by Hitler, 15 September 1935

An original typescript of the laws signed by Hitler was found by the U.S. Army's Counterintelligence Corps in 1945. It ended up in the possession of General George S. Patton, who kept it in violation of orders that such finds should be turned over to the government. During a visit to Los Angeles in 1945, he handed it over to the Huntington Library, where it was stored in a bomb-proof vault. The library revealed the existence of the document in 1999 and sent it on permanent loan to the Skirball Cultural Center, which placed it on public display. The document was transferred to the National Archives and Records Administration in Washington, D.C., in August 2010.

== See also ==
- Anti-Jewish laws
- The Holocaust in Germany
- Nazi eugenics
- Nazi racial theories
- Persecution of black people in Nazi Germany
- Propaganda in Nazi Germany
- Racial hygiene § Nazi Germany
- Racial policy of Nazi Germany
- Racism in Germany
- Romani Holocaust
- Wannsee Conference

== Bibliography ==
- Allen, Nick (26 August 2010). "Nuremberg Laws handed over to US National Archives". The Daily Telegraph. Archived from the original on 1 September 2010.
- Bradsher, Greg (Winter 2010). "The Nuremberg Laws: Archives Receives Original Nazi Documents That "Legalized" Persecution of Jews". Prologue Magazine. 42 (4). National Archives and Records Administration.
- Bullock, Alan (1962) [1952]. Hitler: A Study in Tyranny. London: Penguin Books. LCCN 63005065.
- Burleigh, Michael; Wippermann, Wolfgang (1991). The Racial State: Germany 1933–1945. Cambridge; New York: Cambridge University Press. ISBN 978-0-521-39802-2.
- Dikovski, Antoinette (19 July 2000). "България само администрираше "новите земи"". Демокрация (in Bulgarian). Archived from the original on 18 July 2011.
- Ehrenreich, Eric (2007). The Nazi Ancestral Proof: Genealogy, Racial Science, and the Final Solution. Indiana University Press. ISBN 978-0-253-11687-1.
- Evans, Richard J. (2003). The Coming of the Third Reich. New York: Penguin. ISBN 978-0-14-303469-8.
- Evans, Richard J. (2005). The Third Reich in Power. New York: Penguin. ISBN 978-0-14-303790-3.
- Evans, Richard J. (2008). The Third Reich at War. New York: Penguin. ISBN 978-0-14-311671-4.
- Fischer, Ronit (2012) [2011]. "Transnistria: The Holocaust in Romania". In Friedman, Jonathan C (ed.). Routledge History of the Holocaust. Abingdon; New York: Routledge. pp. 277–290. ISBN 978-0-415-52087-4.
- Friedländer, Saul (2009). Nazi Germany and the Jews, 1933–1945. New York: HarperCollins. ISBN 978-0-06-1350276.
- Frojimovics, Kinga (2012) [2011]. "Special Characteristics of the Holocaust in Hungary, 1938–45". In Friedman, Jonathan C (ed.). Routledge History of the Holocaust. Abingdon; New York: Routledge. pp. 248–263. ISBN 978-0-415-52087-4.
- Gellately, Robert (1991). The Gestapo and German Society: Enforcing Racial Policy, 1933–1945. Oxford: Clarendon Press. ISBN 0-19-820297-0.
- Gilbert, Martin (2002). The Routledge Atlas of the Holocaust. London, England: Routledge. ISBN 978-0-41528-145-4.
- Goldhagen, Daniel (1996). Hitler's Willing Executioners: Ordinary Germans and the Holocaust. New York: Knopf. ISBN 978-0-679-44695-8.
- Gordon, Sarah (1984). Hitler, Germans, and the 'Jewish Question'. Princeton, NJ: Princeton University Press. ISBN 0-691-05412-6.
- Grenville, John (2002) [1998]. "Neglected Holocaust victims: the Mischlinge, the Judischversippte, and the Gypsies". In Berenbaum, Michael; Peck, Abraham J. (eds.). The Holocaust and History: The Known, the Unknown, the Disputed, and the Reexamined. Bloomington, IN: Indiana University Press. pp. 314–326. ISBN 0-253-33374-1.
- Hancock, Ian (2012). "The Neglected Memory of the Romanies". In Friedman, Jonathan C. (ed.). The Routledge History of the Holocaust. New York: Taylor & Francis. pp. 375–384. ISBN 978-0-415-52087-4.
- Hilberg, Raul (2003) [1961]. The Destruction of the European Jews. Vol. III. New Haven; London: Yale University Press. ISBN 978-0-300-09592-0.
- Isaacson, Walter (2007). Einstein: His Life and Universe. New York: Simon & Schuster Paperbacks. ISBN 978-0-7432-6473-0.
- Kershaw, Ian (2008). Hitler: A Biography. New York: W. W. Norton & Company. ISBN 978-0-393-06757-6.
- Longerich, Peter (2010). Holocaust: The Nazi Persecution and Murder of the Jews. Oxford; New York: Oxford University Press. ISBN 978-0-19-280436-5.
- Majer, Diemut (2003). "Non-Germans" under the Third Reich: The Nazi Judicial and Administrative System in Germany and Occupied Eastern Europe, with Special Regard to Occupied Poland, 1939–1945. Baltimore; London: Johns Hopkins University Press. ISBN 0-8018-6493-3.
- Marrus, Michael (2000). The Holocaust and History: The Known, the Unknown, the Disputed, and the Reexamined. Toronto: Key Porter.
- Matić, Igor-Philip (2002). Edmund Veesenmayer: Agent und Diplomat der nationalsozialistischen Expansionspolitik (in German). München: Oldenbourg Verlag. ISBN 978-3-486-56677-2.
- McGarry, Aidan (2010). Who Speaks for Roma?: Political Representation of a Transnational Minority Community. New York; London: Bloomsbury. ISBN 978-0-8264-2880-6.
- Milton, Sybil H. (2001). ""Gypsies" as social outsiders in Nazi Germany". In Gellately, Robert; Stoltzfus, Nathan (eds.). Social Outsiders in Nazi Germany. Princeton: Princeton University Press. ISBN 0-691-08684-2.
- Mommsen, Hans (1989). "The Realization of the Unthinkable: The 'Final Solution of the Jewish Question'". In Marrus, Michael (ed.). The "Final Solution": The Implementation of Mass Murder. The Nazi Holocaust, Part 3. Vol. 1. Westport, CT: Meckler. pp. 217–264. ISBN 0-88736-255-9.
- Morrison, Wayne (2006). Criminology, Civilisation and the New World Order. Abingdon; New York: Routledge. ISBN 978-1-904-38512-7.
- "Reichsbürgergesetz und Gesetz zum Schutze des deutschen Blutes und der deutschen Ehre ["Nürnberger Gesetze"]" (in German). Friedrich-Alexander Universität Erlangen-Nürnberg. 14 November 1935.
- Rhodes, Richard (2003). Masters of Death: The SS-Einsatzgruppen and the Invention of the Holocaust. New York: Vintage. ISBN 978-0-375-70822-0.
- Rodogno, David (2006). Fascism's European Empire: Italian Occupation During the Second World War. Cambridge University Press. ISBN 978-0-521-84515-1.
- Scheil, Stefan (11 March 2012). "Arier". Junge Freiheit (in German).
- Schulz, Edgar Hans; Frercks, Rudolf (1934). Warum Arierparagraph? Ein Beitrag zur Judenfrage [Why the Aryan Law? A Contribution to the Jewish Question] (in German). Berlin: Nazi Party Office of Racial Policy. OCLC 802537.
- Shirer, William L. (1960). The Rise and Fall of the Third Reich. New York: Simon & Schuster. LCCN 60-6729.
- "Sinti and Roma: Victims of the Nazi Era" (PDF). United States Holocaust Memorial Museum.
- Staff (21 March 1933). "Boycott Advocated to Curb Hitlerism; W.W. Cohen Says Any Jew Who Buys Goods Made in Germany Is a 'Traitor". The New York Times.
- Yahil, Leni; Friedman, Ina (1991). The Holocaust: The Fate of European Jewry: 1932-1945. London: Oxford University Press. ISBN 9780195045239.
- "Nuremberg Race Laws". Holocaust Encyclopedia. United States Holocaust Memorial Museum.
- Wildt, Michael (2012). Hitler's Volksgemeinschaftand the Dynamics of Racial Exclusion: Violence Against Jews in Provincial Germany, 1919–1939. Berghahn Books. ISBN 978-0857453228.
- Wolfe, Stephanie (2014). The Politics of Reparations and Apologies. New York: Springer. ISBN 978-1-4614-9184-2.
