= Heinz Wanner =

Swiss geographer and climate researcher

Heinz Wanner (born 25 September 1945 in Biel) is a Swiss geographer and climate researcher. He is a professor emeritus and works at the Oeschger Centre for Climate Change Research of the University of Bern.

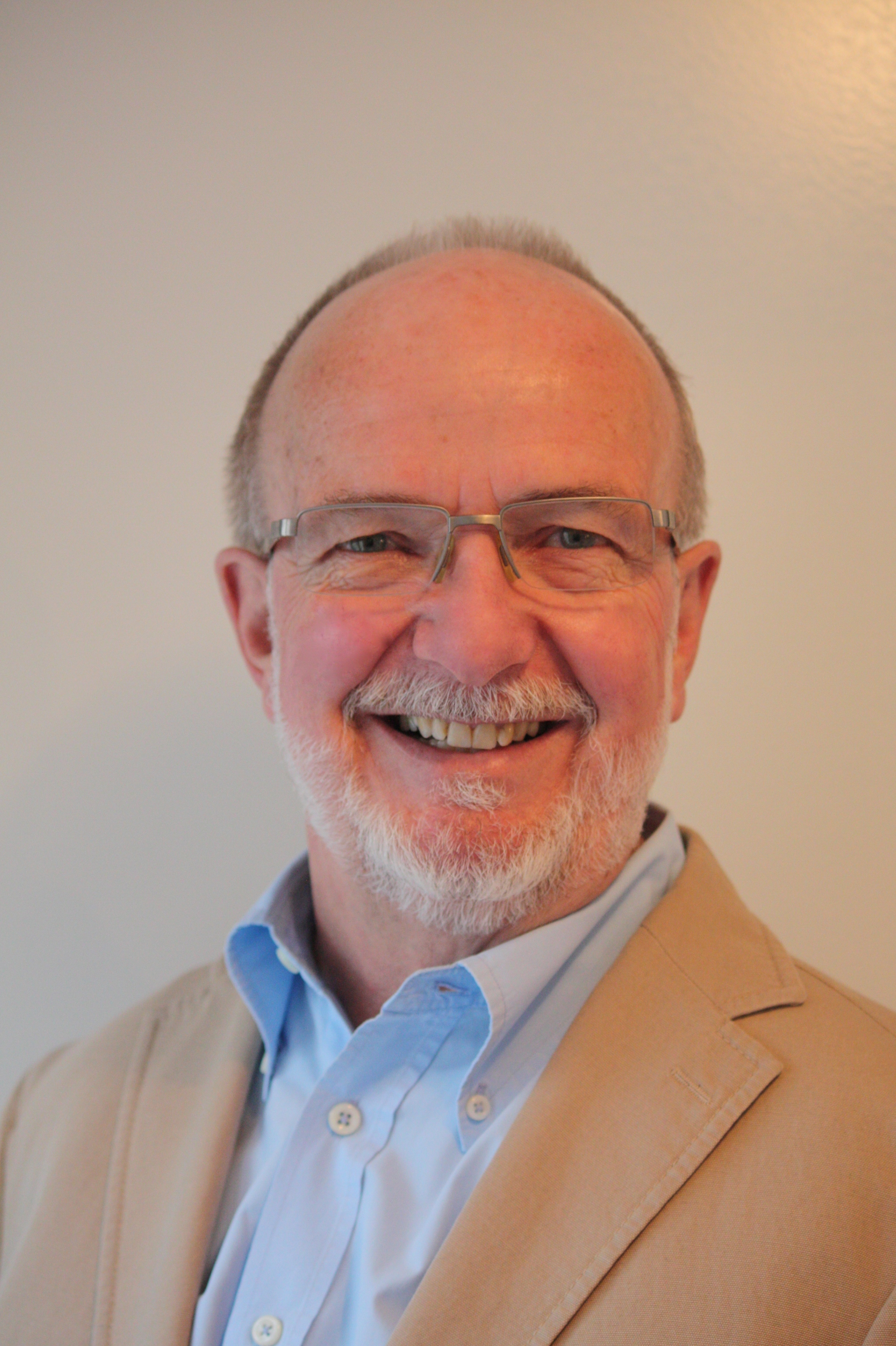
Portrait of Heinz Wanner

== Biography ==
Wanner studied geography, climatology, geology and mathematics in Bern and Grenoble (France). His supervisors were Bruno Messerli, Max Schüepp and Charles Peguy. He initially worked on synoptic climatology, mesoscale dynamics and mountain meteorology. After completing his doctorate on fog and cold air dynamics over the Swiss Plateau, he worked from 1981 to 1982 at the Department of Atmospheric Science of the Colorado State University in Fort Collins (USA) and as deputy operations director of the international Mountain Experiment ALPEX, which was part of the Global Atmospheric Research Programme (GARP). He then worked on air flows and air pollution in the Alpine region (especially photochemical smog) and chaired the EU working group of the ozone field experiment in Heilbronn-Neckarsulm.

In 1988 he was appointed to a professorship at the University of Bern and was co-director of the Swiss research project POLLUMET (Air POLLUtion and METeorology). Since the beginning of the 1990s, he has been mainly involved in palaeoclimatology and was director of the Swiss National Centre of Competence in Climate Research from 2001 to 2007. He collaborated with Hans Oeschger and Thomas Stocker, with colleagues at ETH Zurich and with European and American research groups. From 2007 until his retirement in 2010, he was the founding president of the Oeschger Centre for Climate Change Research at the University of Bern. His main interest today is in the interrelationships between the Earth's climate dynamics and the development of societies. Wanner has published over 200 scientific articles in specialist journals. His book Climate and Humans. A 12,000-Year History (in German) was published in 2016. In 2021, together with Christian Pfister, he published the comprehensive work Climate and Society in Europe. The Last Thousand Years.

Wanner chaired the Swiss Forum for Climate and Global Change ProClim and was also founding president of the Swiss government's advisory body on climate issues OcCC in 1996. Wanner was involved in the Fourth and Fifth Assessment Reports of the UN Intergovernmental Panel on Climate Change (IPCC). From 2005 to 2010 he also acted as a co-chair of the international Past Global Changes (PAGES) programme.

Heinz Wanner is married to Liliane Kocher since 1975 and is the father of a daughter

== Honors ==
In 2006, Heinz Wanner won the Vautrin Lud Prize, the unofficial Nobel Prize for Geography. He is an honorary member of the Swiss Academy of Sciences and a PAGES (Past Global Changes) Fellow, a member of the Leopoldina, received the Medal of Honour from Masaryk University in Brno in 2005 and was awarded the honorary doctorate from Humboldt University in Berlin in 2009

== Publications (selection) ==
- Biel – Klima und Luftverschmutzung einer Schweizer Stadt. Wanner H. (Ed.). Verlag Haupt Bern 1991, 455 S.
- Klimawandel im Schweizer Alpenraum. Wanner H. u.a. Autoren. Verlag der Fachvereine, Hochschulverlag AG an der ETH Zürich, 285 S.
- Klima und Mensch. Eine 12.000-jährige Geschichte. Verlag Haupt, Bern 2016, ISBN 978-3-258-07879-3 (populärwissenschaftliches Werk zur holozänen Klimageschichte, 2. Auflage 2020, 280 S.).
- Climate and Society in Europe – The Last 1000 Years. Verlag Haupt Bern 2021, 400pp.
- Wanner H., Brönnimann S., Casty C., Gyalistras D., Luterbacher J., Schmutz C., Stephenson D.B., Xoplaki E., 2001. North Atlantic Oscillation – concepts and studies. Surveys in Geophysics 22, 321-382.
- Luterbacher J., Dietrich D., Xoplaki E., Grosjean M., Wanner H., 2004. European seasonal temperature variability, trends and extremes since 1500. Science 303, 1499-1503.
- Wanner H. et al., 2008. Mid- to Late Holocene climate change: an overview, Quaternary Science Reviews., 27, 1791-1828.
- Interview with Heinz Wanner by Hans von Storch. Atmospheric Sciences Section of AGU Newsletter 3(3), 4-5. https://www.academia.edu/4092912/Interview_with_Heinz_Wanner_Bern.
- Wanner H., Solomina O., Grosjean M., Ritz S.P., Jetel M., 2011. Structure and origin of Holocene cold events. Quaternary Science Reviews 30, 3109-3123.
- PAGES 2k Consortium (co-author: H. Wanner), 2013. Continental-scale Temperature variability during the past two millennia. Nature Geoscience 6, 339- 346.
- Solomina O. et al. (co-author: H. Wanner), 2016. Glacier fluctuations during the past 2000 years. Quaternary Science Reviews 149, 61-90.
- Kobashi, T. et al. (co-author: H. Wanner), 2017. Volcanic influence on centennial to millennial Holocene Greenland temperature change. Nature Scientific Reports 7, Article 1441.
- Wanner H., 2021. Late Holocene: Cooler or warmer? The Holocene 31(9), 1501 –1506.
