= Christian Pfister (Swiss historian) =

Swiss historian (born 1944)

Christian Pfister (2026)

Christian Pfister (born 23 August 1944 in Bern) is a Swiss historian.

== Life ==
Pfister studied history and geography at the University of Bern from 1966 to 1970, where he graduated in 1974. This was followed by study visits to the University of Rochester and the University of East Anglia in Norwich. He habilitated in 1982. From 1990 to 1996, Pfister was supported by the Swiss National Science Foundation (SNSF) in his research on climate history. From 1997 until his retirement in 2009, he was Full Professor of Economic, Social and Environmental History at the Historical Institute of the University of Bern. For the first time, his professorship combined the three pillars of the sustainability discourse. Since 2009, he has been working as a freelance researcher at the Oeschger Centre for Climate Research at the University of Bern. His successor at the University of Bern in 2010 was Christian Rohr, who is now Professor of Environmental and Climate History. Pfister acted as founding president of the European Society for Environmental History (ESEH). In addition to climate history, he has made a name for himself in agricultural history, population history, regional history, the history of natural disasters and environmental history. In 2026, he published an academic biography.

== Work ==
=== Climate history ===
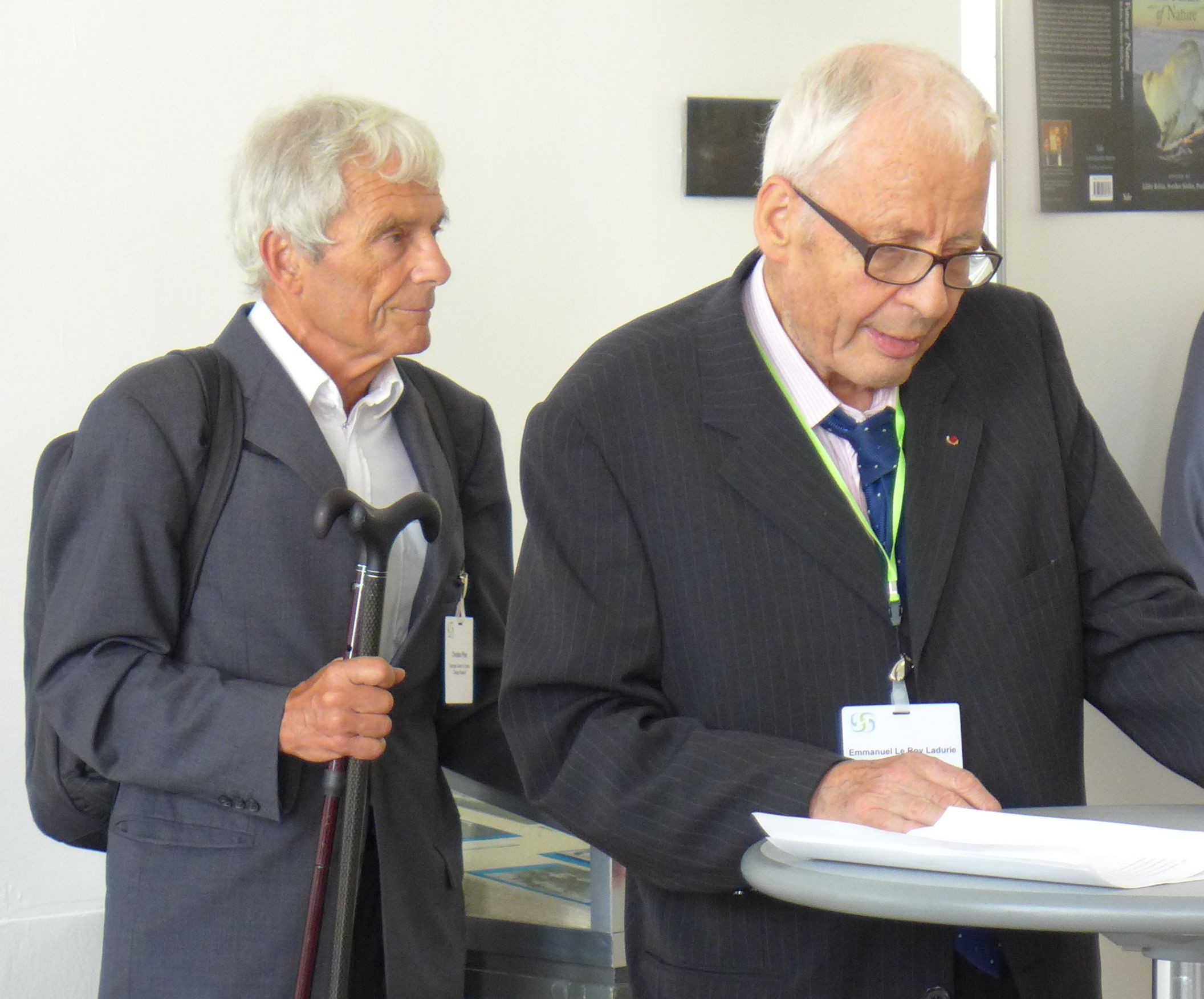
Christian Pfister (left) and Emmanuel Le Roy Ladurie 2013

Pfister is regarded as one of the pioneers in the field of historical climatology. His research focuses on the social dimension of climate change and nature induced disasters, and the reconstruction of past weather and climate change from historical documents for the period before the use of instrumental measurements. He is particularly known for the further development of the Pfister climate indices, named after him, into a powerful instrument for the reconstruction of approximate values for temperatures and precipitation from historical documents. In this way, Pfister has succeeded in "connecting climate history with quantitative climate science. (...) The results obtained from Climate History, especially those concerning extreme events, contribute to improving risk assessment by broadening the basis of statistics." The project "European Palaeoclimate and Man since the Last Glaciation" of the "European Science Foundation" (1989) became important for historical climate research in the longer term. In this context, Pfister led a research group that gathered documentary data from all over Europe to reconstruct monthly weather charts for the period 1675–1715. In this context, he adapted the Climhist software package, developed for the documentation of the "Climate History of Switzerland" (1984), to create the European database Euro-Climhist. Since the 1990s, Pfister has gradually expanded and methodically refined the database. Today (2019), Euro-Climhist is the largest climate history database with over 200,000 records.

=== Agricultural history ===
Agricultural-historical topics occupy a large space in Pfister's writings, since they are closely linked to climate history and population history. He distinguishes four agricultural utilisation zones in Old Swiss Confederacy: the cereal-growing area in the Swiss Plateau, the pastoral area in mountainous areas, a zone of mixed field-grass cultivation in hilly areas, and areas of intensive viticulture. The main focus of his analysis and models is on cereal production. In this context Pfister has worked out the importance of the nitrogen cycle for productivity development. 3

=== Population history ===
Since Erich Keyser’s Population History of Germany (Leipzig, 1938) no synthesis had been written for German speaking areas in the Early Modern Period. At the beginning of the 1990s, Christian Pfister took on the task of collecting and compiling a hardly comprehensible number of small-scale, at best regional and heterogeneous studies worked out over half a century, and to press them into the framework of a small volume of the Encyclopaedia of German History.

=== Regional history ===
Both Christian Pfister’s dissertation (1974) and his habilitation thesis (1984) were committed to the histoire totale of the Annales School in addition to climate history. His focus on the Canton of Bern opened up a field of regional history that continued to occupy him in the years that followed. Through the fine division of its landscape, the Canton of Bern offers a patchwork of zones which followed different paths in their development. Pfister’s monograph "Im Strom der Modernisierung" (Bern, 1995) meets the methodological postulate of a histoire totale with extraordinary precision and spatial-temporal differentiation; and can be regarded as a material history in the best sense of the word, in which energy sources and food, agricultural production methods and their modernization appear just as much as the people who give birth, eat, work, argue, invent, try, age and die, and are not only processed into statistical series of numbers.

Concurrent to Climhist, Christian Pfister set up the BERNHIST regional history database from 1984. In 2009, the database contained around 1.5 million individual data from the fields of population, economy, environment and politics for the period from 1700 to the present. In 2019, a modernized version of BERNHIST was launched.

=== Environmental history ===
Based on its energy base (biomass, coal, oil, and gas), Pfister divides economic and environmental history into three fundamental social periods – agricultural society, industrial society and consumer society. His thesis is that the current urgency of the climate problem and the glut of plastic waste is due to the flooding of markets with cheap oil from the late 1950s onwards. The corresponding anthology (Pfister 1995b) experienced a second edition in 1996. An enlarged synthesis in English was published in 2010.

=== History of nature induced disasters ===
From 1882 to 1976, Switzerland was largely spared natural disasters. Pfister demonstrates that this "disaster gap" (German: Katastrophenlücke) contributed to natural risks being underestimated until the late 1980s. It was not until this time that natural disasters were discovered as an attractive topic in historical research. In his "Weather Hindcast" (1999), Pfister links the climate variations of the last five hundred years in Switzerland with the description of severe natural disasters. He postulates that natural disasters can be regarded as pacemakers of modernization and, at least in Switzerland, were fundamental for the development of a nationwide solidarity between the poor mountain regions and the wealthy regions in the Swiss Plateau. With these theses he succeeded in giving a new depth to the primarily cultural-historical discussion about the interpretation and perception of disasters. He has written several articles on natural disasters and, together with Christof Mauch, published an anthology on this topic in 2009.

== Distinctions ==
Christian Pfister was awarded the following distinctions:

- Theodor Kocher-Prize of the Bern University (1986)
- Honorary Member of Romanian Scientists’ Academy (1997)
- Eduard Brückner-Prize for "outstanding interdisciplinary achievements in climate research" (2000)
- Bronze Medal of the Faculty of Sciences of Masaryk-University in Brno (Czech Republic) "for his valuable contribution to the development of scientific cooperation and to the progress of historical climate research" (2009)
- Doctor honoris causa of the Universidad Ricardo Palma in Lima "en reconocimiento a su destacada trayectoria profesional y por sus aportes en el camp de la Historia del Clima" (2010)

== Publications (selection) ==
=== Monographs and important articles ===
- Agrarkonjunktur und Witterungsverlauf im westlichen Schweizer Mittelland zur Zeit der Ökonomischen Patrioten 1755–1797. Ein Beitrag zur Umwelt- und Wirtschaftsgeschichte des 18. Jahrhunderts. Geographisches Institut der Universität Bern, Bern 1975.
- Das Klima der Schweiz von 1525–1860 und seine Bedeutung in der Geschichte von Bevölkerung und Landwirtschaft. Haupt, Bern 1984.
- Bevölkerungsgeschichte und historische Demographie 1500–1800 (= Enzyklopädie deutscher Geschichte. Bd. 28). Oldenbourg, München 1994, ISBN 3-486-58157-0.
- Im Strom der Modernisierung. Bevölkerung, Wirtschaft und Umwelt im Kanton Bern (1700–1914). Bern 1995 (Full text online).
- Wetternachhersage. 500 Jahre Klimavariationen und Naturkatastrophen (1496–1995). Haupt, Bern 1999, ISBN 3-258-05696-X.
- The “Black Swan” of 1540. Aspects of a European Megadrought, in: Klaus Leggewie and Franz Mauelshagen (eds.), Climatic Change and Cultural Transition in Europe, Brill, Leiden 2018: 156-196.
- Christian Pfister and Heinz Wanner: Climate and Society in Europe, The Last Thousand Years, Bern 2021, ISBN 978-3-258-08234-9.

=== Editions ===
- with Peter Brimblecombe, The silent countdown. Essays in European Environmental History. Springer, Berlin, New York 1990.
- Am Tag danach: Zur Bewältigung von Naturkatastrophen in der Schweiz 1500–2000. Haupt, Bern 2002, ISBN 3-258-06436-9.
- with Wolfgang Behringer, Hartmut Lehmann: Cultural Consequences of the «Little Ice Age». Vandenhoeck & Ruprecht, Göttingen 2005. ISBN 3-525-35864-4.
- with Christof Mauch: Natural disasters, cultural responses: case studies toward a global environmental history. Lexington Books, Lanham 2009.
- with Daniel Krämer and Daniel Marc Segesser: «Woche für Woche neue Preisaufschläge »: Nahrungsmittel-, Energie- und Ressourcenkonflikte in der Schweiz des Ersten Weltkrieges, Schwabe, Basel 2016.
- with Sam White and Franz Mauelshagen: The Palgrave Handbook of Climate History, Palgrave Macmillan, London 2018 ISBN 978-1-137-43019-9

=== Festschrift ===
- Daniel Krämer and Stephanie Summermatter. Introduction to: Sustainable History. Festschrift for Christian Pfister. Chronos, Zürich 2009, ISBN 978-3-0340-0992-8, translated from German.

=== Scientific biography ===
- Christian Pfister: My Scientific biography, published 2026 on Boris (Bern Open Repository and Information System), University of Bern, doi:10.48620/99584 (PDF)

Complete publication list online
