= Social Outsiders in Nazi Germany =

2001 book by Gellately and Stoltzfus

- Editor: Robert Gellately; Nathan Stoltzfus
- Language: English
- Genre: Non-fiction
- Publisher: Princeton University Press
- Publication date: 2001
- Publication place: United States
- Media type: Print (hardcover); Print (paperback)
- Pages: 320
- ISBN: 978-0-691-00748-9

Social Outsiders in Nazi Germany is a book edited by Robert Gellately and Nathan Stoltzfus. It is a collection of essays offering the history of those branded "social outsiders" in Nazi Germany.

It was published by Princeton University Press as a 320-page hardcover (ISBN 978-0-691-00748-9) and paperback (ISBN 978-0-691-08684-2) in 2001.
