= Heather Marie Stoll =

American geologist (born 1973)

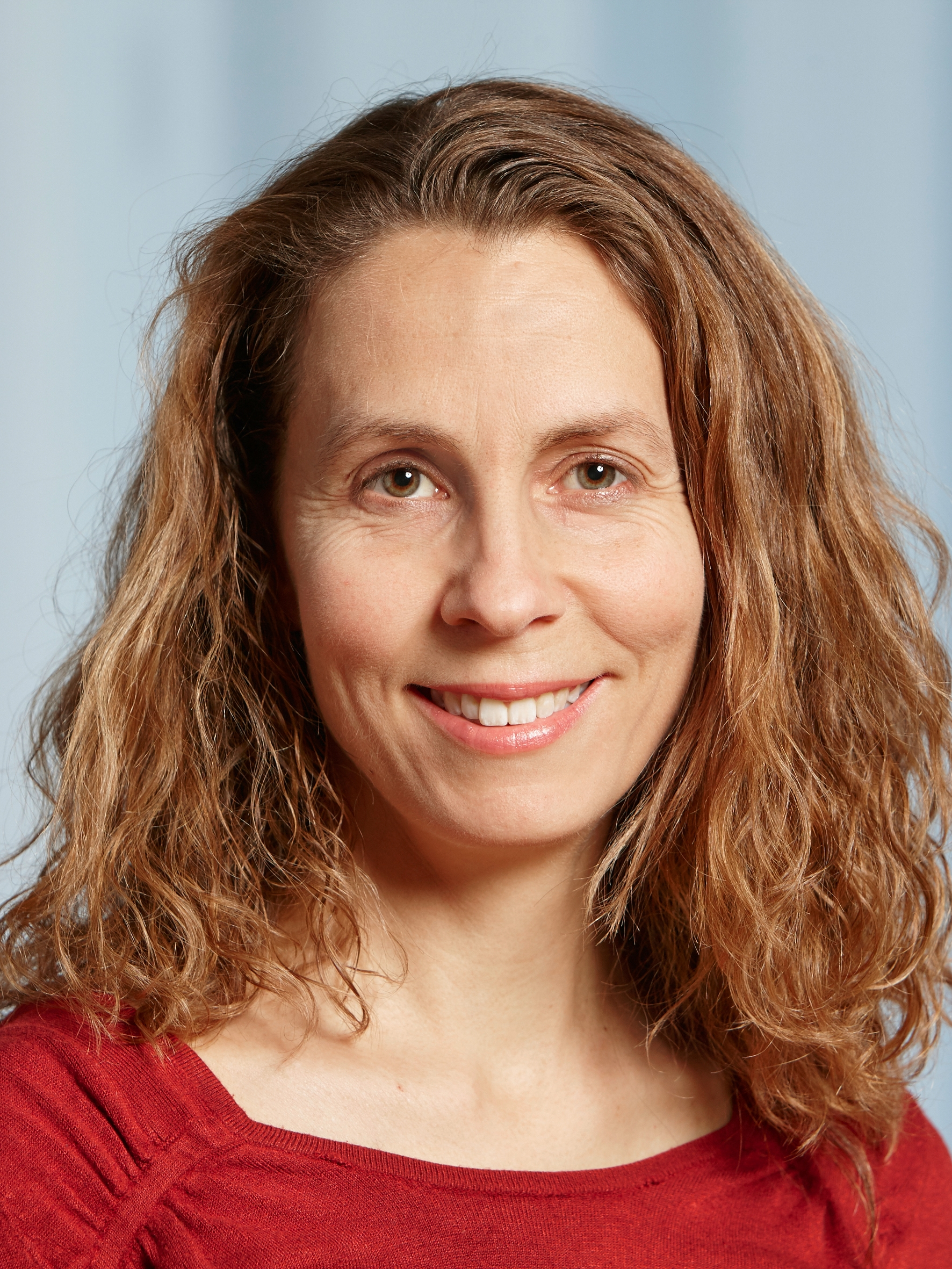
- Stoll in 2017
- Citizenship: United States
- Education: Williams College (BA); Princeton University (PhD)
- Awards: Young Scientist Award (2007); Hans Oeschger Medal (2025)
- Scientific career
- Fields: Geology, Paleoclimatology, Geochemistry
- Workplaces: ETH Zurich; Williams College

Heather Marie Stoll (born 1973) is an American geologist and researcher affiliated with ETH Zurich in Switzerland.

== Career ==
Stoll completed her B.A at Williams College in 1994. She started teaching as an assistant professor, focusing on the area of Earth Systems Science in Williams College from 1994. She received her PhD in geochemistry from Princeton University in 1998.

As an assistant professor at Williams College, she was awarded The Young Scientist Award from the European Geoscience Union in 2007. She has made major contributions to both the marine and terrestrial paleoclimate communities. The 2025 Hans Oeschger Medal was awarded to Heather Marie Stoll for contributions in both marine and terrestrial palaeoclimate research. Her research includes: Geology and Paleoclimatology, Marine and coastal ecosystems, Paleontology and Stratigraphy of Fossils, Isotope, Analysis in Ecology, Marine Biology and, Ecology, Methane Hydrates and Related Phenomena, and Karst Systems and Hydrogeology.

She has a total of 318 publications as of November 2026.

== Publication ==
- The Miocene: The Future of the Past (M. Steinthorsdottir; H. K. Coxall; A. M. de Boer; M. Huber)
- Atmospheric CO2 over the Past 66 Million Years from Marine Archives (James W.B. Rae; Yi Ge Zhang; Xiaoqing Liu; Gavin L. Foster)
- High-resolution stable isotope records from the Upper Cretaceous rocks of Italy and Spain: Glacial episodes in a greenhouse planet? (Heather M. Stoll; Daniel P. Schrag)
- Taconian orogeny in the New England Appalachians: Collision between Laurentia and the Shelburne Falls arc (Paul Karabinos; Scott D. Samson; J. Christopher Hepburn; Heather M. Stoll)
- Effects of Quaternary Sea Level Cycles on Strontium in Seawater (Heather M Stoll; Daniel P Schrag)
- Sinking of coccolith carbonate and potential contribution to organic carbon ballasting in the deep ocean (Patrizia Ziveri; Bianca de Bernardi; Karl Heinz Baumann; Heather M. Stoll)
- Evidence for Glacial Control of Rapid Sea Level Changes in the Early Cretaceous (Heather M. Stoll; Daniel P. Schrag)
- A speleothem record of glacial (25-11.6 kyr BP) rapid climatic changes from northern Iberian Peninsula (Ana Moreno; Heather Stoll; Montserrat Jiménez-Sánchez; Isabel Cacho)
- Coccolith Sr/Ca as a new indicator of coccolithophorid calcification and growth rate (Heather M. Stoll; Daniel P. Schrag)
- Late Miocene threshold response of marine algae to carbon dioxide limitation (Clara T. Bolton; Heather M. Stoll)
- Stable isotope ‘vital effects’ in coccolith calcite (P. Ziveri; H. M. Stoll; I. Probert; Christine Klaas)
- Decrease in coccolithophore calcification and CO2 since the middle Miocene. (Clara T. Bolton; Maria T. Hernandez-Sanchez; Miguel-Ángel Fuertes; Saul Gonzalez-Lemos)
- Evolutionary trends in RuBisCO kinetics and their co-evolution with CO2 concentrating mechanisms. (Concepción Iñiguez; Sebastià Capó‐Bauçà; Ülo Niinemets; Heather Stoll)
- The last deglaciation in the Picos de Europa National Park (Cantabrian Mountains, northern Spain) (Ana Moreno; Blas L. Valero-Garcés; Montserrat Jiménez-Sánchez; María José Domínguez-Cuesta)
- Climate proxies from Sr/Ca of coccolith calcite: calibrations from continuous culture of Emiliania huxleyi (Heather M Stoll; Yair Rosenthal; Paul Falkowski)
- Sr/Ca variations in Cretaceous carbonates: relation to productivity and sea level changes (Heather M. Stoll; Daniel P. Schrag)
- Are seawater Sr/Ca variations preserved in quaternary foraminifera? (Heather M. Stoll; Daniel P. Schrag; Steven C. Clemens)
- I-STAL, a model for interpretation of Mg/Ca, Sr/Ca and Ba/Ca variations in speleothems and its forward and inverse application on seasonal to millennial scales (Heather M. Stoll; Wolfgang Müller; Manolo Prieto)
- Paleoclimate and growth rates of speleothems in the northwestern Iberian Peninsula over the last two glacial cycles (Heather M. Stoll; Ana Moreno; Ana Mendez-Vicente; Saul Gonzalez-Lemos)
- Upregulation of phytoplankton carbon concentrating mechanisms during low CO2 glacial periods and implications for the phytoplankton pCO2 proxy (Heather M. Stoll; Jose Guitian; Ivan Hernandez-Almeida; Luz Maria Mejia)
- Calcification rate and temperature effects on Sr partitioning in coccoliths of multiple species of coccolithophorids in culture (Heather M Stoll; Christine M Klaas; Ian Probert; Jorge Ruiz Encinar)
- Coccolith Sr/Ca records of productivity during the Paleocene-Eocene thermal maximum from the Weddell Sea (Heather M. Stoll; Santo Bains)
