= Sherilyn C. Fritz =

American paleoecologist

Sherilyn Claire Fritz
- Scientific career
- Institutions: University of Nebraska–Lincoln
- Thesis: Lake ontogeny and land-use history in Diss, Norfolk, England (1985)

Sherilyn Fritz is known for her research on paleoclimate and paleoecology, with a particular focus on the use of diatoms to reconstruct past environmental conditions.

== Education and career ==
Fritz earned a B.A. in Biology from Macalester College in 1974 and an M.S. in Biology from Kent State University in 1979. In 1985, she earned a Ph.D. in Ecology from the University of Minnesota. From 1985 to 1994, Fritz was a research associate at the University of Minnesota, and then she moved to Lehigh University where she remained until 1998. Fritz moved to the University of Nebraska–Lincoln in 1999 and was named the George Holmes Professor in 2010.

In 2020, Fritz was named a fellow of the American Geophyiscal Union and the citation reads

For contributions in paleolimnology and paleoclimatology, shaping our understanding of the sensitivity of lake systems worldwide to environmental change

== Research ==
Fritz is known for her research on historical climatology, specifically using the distribution of diatoms in lake and marine sediments to infer past and present environmental conditions. She first used this during her master's research at an acid strip-mine lake in Ohio where she detailed the lake's recovery from strip mining.

For her Ph.D. work, Fritz worked at Diss Mere in Norfolk, United Kingdom where she used pollen records to track the region's shift from a grassy woodland to a forested ecosystem, and identified the impact of humans on local vegetation. A related publication used the shifting presence of diatoms in stratified lake sediments to detail periods of oxygen depletion in the lake and regional deforestation.

The examination of diatoms in sediments has allowed Fritz to establish past changes in salinity and climate. This research spans a wide geographical range from across the North America Great Plains, where her research has reconstructed the regional shifts in rainfall and climate and has revealed historically high frequencies of drought in the region compared to the present conditions. Fritz has also examined vegetation and climate in southern Italy, Yellowstone, and Glacier Bay, Alaska. In South America, her research has looked at changes in precipitation, temperature, glaciation, and climate variation in the Quaternary period.

Fritz has also been involved in research that uses the distribution of diatoms to examine changes in water quality in Minnesota lakes, to track the development of lakes after glaciers retreat, and to delineate the history of ancient lakes that formed more than 100,000 years ago.

=== Selected publications ===
- Fritz, Sherilyn C. (1990). "Twentieth-century salinity and water-level fluctuations in Devils Lake, North Dakota: Test of a diatom-based transfer function". Limnology and Oceanography. 35 (8): 1771–1781. Bibcode:1990LimOc..35.1771F. doi:10.4319/lo.1990.35.8.1771. ISSN 1939-5590.
- Fritz, Sherilyn C.; Ito, Emi; Yu, Zicheng; Laird, Kathleen R.; Engstrom, Daniel R. (2000). "Hydrologic Variation in the Northern Great Plains During the Last Two Millennia". Quaternary Research. 53 (2): 175–184. Bibcode:2000QuRes..53..175F. doi:10.1006/qres.1999.2115. ISSN 0033-5894. S2CID 6456106.
- Fritz, Sherilyn C. (1996). "Paleolimnological records of climatic change in North America". Limnology and Oceanography. 41 (5): 882–889. Bibcode:1996LimOc..41..882F. doi:10.4319/lo.1996.41.5.0882. ISSN 1939-5590.
- Fritz, S. C.; Juggins, S.; Battarbee, R. W.; Engstrom, D. R. (1991). "Reconstruction of past changes in salinity and climate using a diatom-based transfer function". Nature. 352 (6337): 706–708. Bibcode:1991Natur.352..706F. doi:10.1038/352706a0. ISSN 1476-4687. S2CID 4325091.

== Awards and honors ==
- Fellow, American Association for the Advancement of Science (2013)
- Hans Oeschger Medal, European Geophysical Union (2014)
- Israel C. Russell Award, Geological Society of America, Geolimnology Division (2018)
- Fellow, American Geophysical Union (2020)
- Bert Bolin Climate Lecture, Stockholm University (2021)
- Member, National Academy of Sciences (2025)
