= Oeschger Centre for Climate Change Research =

Climatological research institute

Oeschger Centre for Climate and Climate Change Research
- Established: 2007
- Rector: Fortunat Joos
- Location: Bern
- Website: www.oeschger.unibe.ch
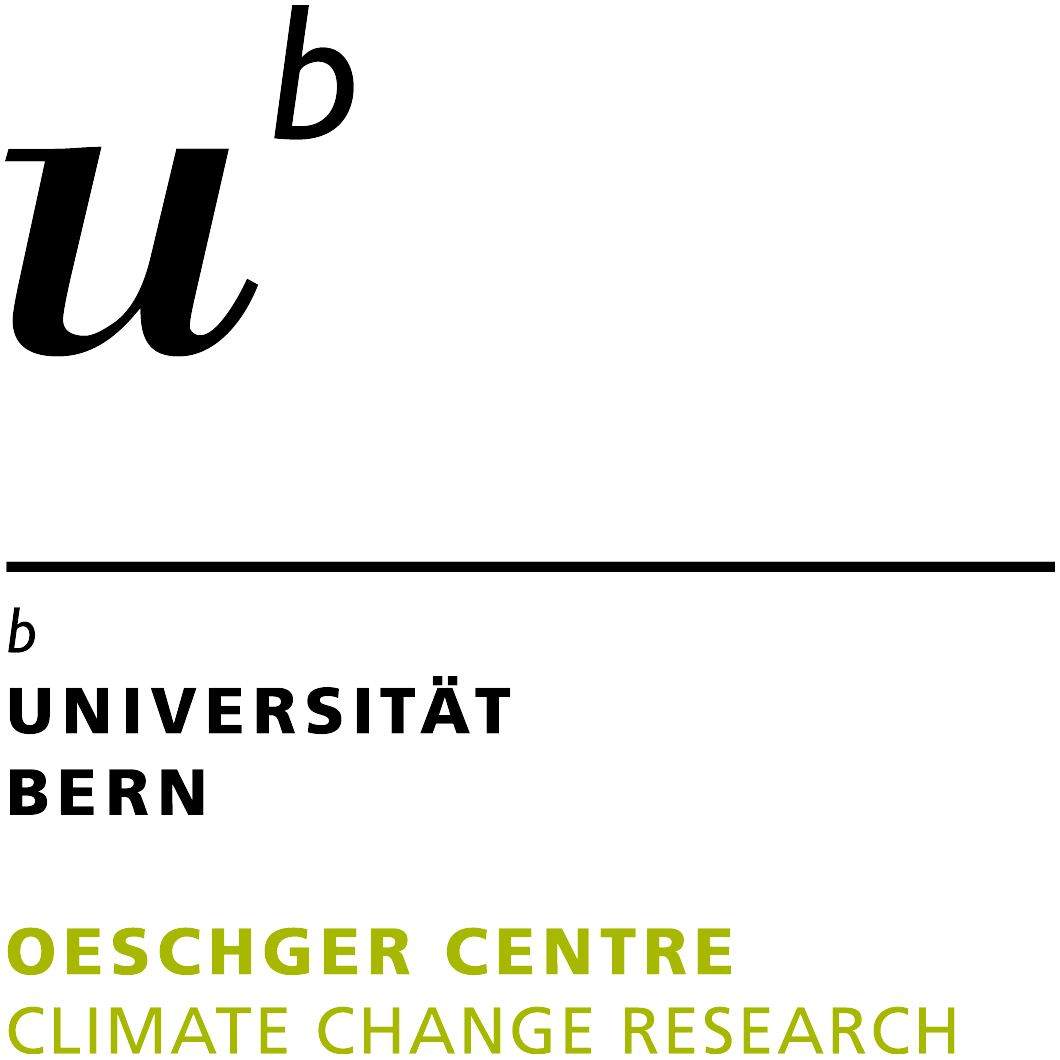

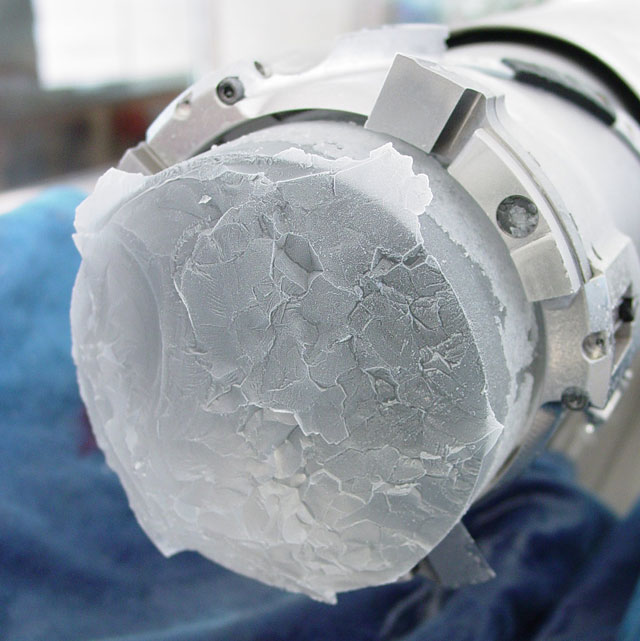

The Oeschger Centre for Climate and Climate Change Research (OCCR) is the interdisciplinary centre of excellence for climate research of the University of Bern.

== History ==
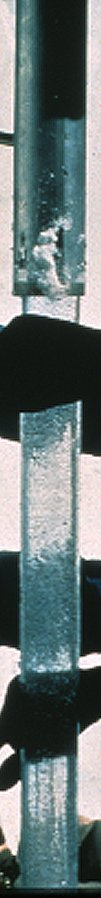
Ice core sample taken from drill. Photo by Lonnie Thompson, Byrd Polar Research Center

The centre was established in 2007 and was named after Hans Oeschger (1927-1998), a pioneer of modern climate research, who worked in Bern. The OCCR brings together researchers from nine institutes and four faculties. It has more than 200 members working in 26 research groups. The OCCR is at the forefront of international research in a number of different fields. Researchers from the University of Bern have participated as co-chair, coordinating lead authors or lead authors in all the assessment reports so far published by the IPCC. Many of them are still working today at the OCCR. In addition to research within disciplines, the OCCR puts special emphasis on interdisciplinary projects. Regionally rooted and globally linked, the OCCR hopes to find ways to meet the challenge of global climate change at many different levels through the collaboration of experts in the natural, human and social sciences, in economics and law. The OCCR is active not only in research; it is also involved in teaching and runs the Graduate School of Climate Sciences.

== Overview ==
=== Research ===
The Oeschger Centre (OCCR) conducts research on the one hand into the long-term development and dynamics of the climate system and the climate of the present and the future. On the other hand, it investigates the impact of climate change on important land ecosystems as well as on the economy and society. In particular it works on strategies to adapt to the changing climate and to slow down climate change. At the centre of the OCCR's research is the climate system and its interaction with society and the economy.

Specific areas of research include:

- the climate system with its different interactive components in the oceans, continents (especially vegetation, the cryosphere, aquatic systems, etc.) and in the atmosphere
- energy and material cycles (e.g. water, carbon and greenhouse gases) from the global to the local level.
- the dynamics of the climate and environment over long periods of time (palaeoclimatology, palaeoecology) from the late Pleistocene, Holocene and the present day to the near future
- the interaction of changes in the climate and environment with the economy and society, in particular the economics of climate change and the consequences of extreme events on the economy and society

The Oeschger Centre uses models of varying kinds and complexity, and also takes measurements and carries out reconstructions of important climate variables (e.g. natural and man-made radiative forcing).

=== Teaching ===
The Oeschger Centre runs the University of Bern's Graduate School of Climate Sciences and offers academic training to MSc and PhD level. For the specialist "MSc in Climate Sciences" (120 ECTS), applicants have to pass through a selection process. Students put together their own curriculum by selecting courses from a range of topics offered by several different faculties. The selection can lead to any one of five specialisations. The OCCR's main areas of research are reflected in the curriculum of the courses offered by the Graduate School of Climate Sciences.

The Oeschger Centre has a decidedly international outlook in its teaching, and works closely with the Swiss Federal Institute of Technology in Zürich. More than a third of its students come from abroad, and all teaching is conducted in English. The PhD programme is strongly research-orientated, and lasts for three to four years. Students with a degree from the Graduate School of Climate Sciences may take up academic careers, work in the private sector – for example in banks or in insurance – or in the environmental sector for the government or with non-governmental organisations.

== Structure ==
=== Organisation ===
The Oeschger Centre for Climate Research (OCCR) is an interdisciplinary centre at the University of Bern, made up of research groups from the participating institutes. Administratively it is part of the Faculty of Science. The OCCR received its mandate from the university's governing body. The president, director and a scientific committee made up of representatives of the participating faculties and institutes are responsible for the strategic management of the OCCR. The OCCR is run by a management centre which encourages collaboration between the research groups, provides services for the researchers and publicises the work of the OCCR.

=== Research groups ===
The Oeschger Centre includes the following research groups:

- Air Pollution/Climate (Jürg Fuhrer)
- Analytical Chemistry Research (Margit Schwikowski)
- Aquatic Paleoecology (Oliver Heiri)
- Atmospheric Radiometry and Processes (Niklaus Kämpfer)
- Climatology (Stefan Brönnimann)
- Climate and Society (Heli Huhtamaa)
- Climate Epidemiology and Public Health (Ana Maria Vicedo Cabrera)
- Climate Change, Trade and Environmental Economy (Thomas Cottier)
- Dendroclimatology (David Frank)
- Earth System Modeling – Bio-Geo-Chemical Cycles (Fortunat Joos)
- Earth System Modeling – Atmosphere Ocean Dynamics (Thomas Stocker)
- Environmental and Climate Economics (Ralph Winkler)
- Environmental and Climate Economics (Gunter Stephan)
- Environmental History and Historical Climatology (Christian Rohr)
- Environmental Isotopes and Gases (Markus Leuenberger)
- Environmental Policy Analysis (Karin Ingold)
- Hydrology (Rolf Weingartner)
- Laboratory for the Analysis of Radiocarbon with AMS (LARA) (Sönke Szidat)
- Lake Sediments and Paleolimnology (Martin Grosjean)
- Mobiliar Group for Climate Change Impact Research (Olivia Romppainen-Martius)
- Past Climate and Biogeochemical Studies on Ice Cores (Hubertus Fischer)
- Plant Ecology (Markus Fischer)
- Plant Nutrition and Ecophysiology (Urs Feller)
- Terrestrial Paleoecology (Willy Tinner)
