= Rachel Carson Center for Environment and Society =

German research center

Coordinates: 48.1551°N 11.5828°E

Rachel Carson center logo subtitle

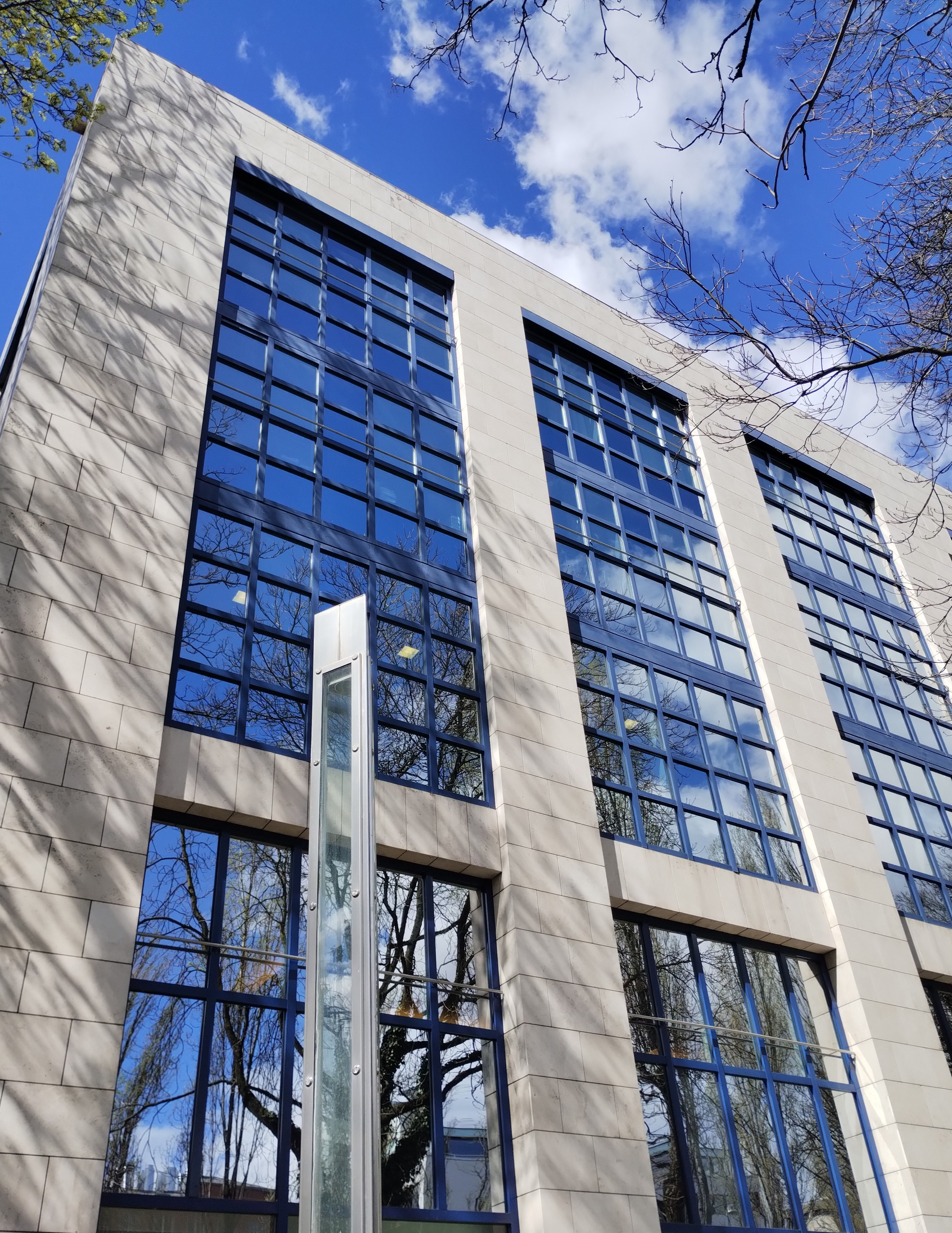
Front view of the Rachel Carson Center

The Rachel Carson Center for Environment and Society (RCC) is an international, interdisciplinary center for research and education in the environmental humanities located in Munich, Germany. It was founded in 2009 as a joint initiative of LMU Munich and the Deutsches Museum, and it is supported by the German Federal Ministry of Education and Research. The center is named after the American biologist, nature writer, and environmentalist, Rachel Carson.

The RCC's founding directors are Christof Mauch of LMU Munich and Helmuth Trischler of the Deutsches Museum. In 2023, a new LMU Chair of Environmental Humanities, Sonja Dümpelmann, joined the center. Following Christof Mauch's retirement in July 2026, the RCC entered a phase of transition with two new interim directors, Julia Pongratz and Ralf Ludwig.

== Research ==
The Rachel Carson Center facilitates research on the interaction between human agents and nature. Its goal is to strengthen the role of the humanities in current political and scientific debates about the environment. While the center is located in Munich, Germany, its working language is English and the RCC's staff and fellows come from all over the world.

After the program's launch in 2022, the center hosted a rotating group of nine international Landhaus fellows, who lived at the RCC Landhaus at Hermannsdorfer Landwerkstätten during their fellowship. The Landhaus fellowship program ended in summer 2025. This was followed by an Alumni fellowship program in 2026 that brought six alumni fellows back to the RCC.

Besides the funded fellowship program, the RCC hosts a number of postgraduate programs. This includes the structured Doctoral Program Environment and Society (ProEnviron), the Master of Arts Environment and Society, a certificate program for Master students in Environmental Studies, and the International Doctorate Program Rethinking Environment (IDK), which is organized in cooperation with the Environmental Science Center at the University of Augsburg.

To share and discuss the work of its researchers and visitors, the RCC hosts a series of public colloquia, conferences, and workshops. The center’s outreach program also includes the development of exhibitions in collaboration with the Deutsches Museum.

The RCC has tight connections to its partner institutions all across the world, including Madison, Pécs, Beijing, Tallinn, Venice, Vienna, and Zurich.

== Outreach and publications ==
The Rachel Carson Center is represented in print through Environment in History: International Perspectives, an English-language book series developed in collaboration with the European Society for Environmental History (ESEH) and published by Berghahn Books and through Umwelt und Gesellschaft (Environment and Society), a German-language book series with Vandenhoeck & Ruprecht.

The RCC also curates the Environment and Society Portal, a gateway platform that aims to make digitized environmental humanities resources and interpretive exhibitions more accessible to academics and the public at large. In addition, the RCC has three ongoing online publications, Arcadia, Springs: The Rachel Carson Center Review, and Seeing the Woods.

Additionally, the RCC manages a YouTube account.
