= Kim Cobb =

American climate scientist and academic (born 1974)

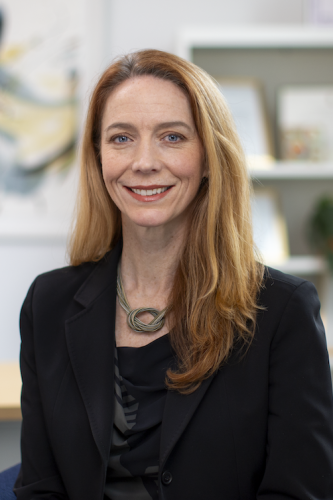
- Cobb in 2025
- Born: Kim Cobb; 1974 (age 51–52); Madison, Virginia, US
- Education: Yale University
- Occupation: Climate scientist
- Known for: Paleoclimatology, Oceanography, Geochemistry
- Scientific career
- Workplaces: Georgia Institute of Technology; Brown University

Kim M. Cobb (born 1974) is an American climate scientist, professor of Environment and Society and of Earth, Environmental and Planetary Sciences at Brown University, and director of the Institute at Brown for Environment and Society. Cobb was previously a professor in the School of Earth and Atmospheric Sciences at the Georgia Institute of Technology. She is particularly interested in oceanography, geochemistry and paleoclimate modeling.

== Early life and education ==
Kim Cobb was born in 1974 in Madison, Virginia, US. She grew up in Pittsfield, Massachusetts. She became interested in oceanography after attending a summer school at Woods Hole Oceanographic Institution, Massachusetts. She studied biology and geology at Yale University, where she became increasingly aware of the anthropogenic causes of climate change. She moved off her original pre-med track and applied for a summer program at the Scripps Institution of Oceanography, graduating in 1996. Cobb completed her PhD in oceanography at Scripps in 2002, hunting El Niño events in a sediment core from Santa Barbara. She spent two years as a post doc at Caltech before joining Georgia Tech as an assistant professor in 2004. She has published over 100 peer-reviewed publications in major journals. She became a full professor in 2015 and supervises several PhD and MSc students.

== Research ==
Cobb's group seeks to understand global climate change and identify the natural and anthropogenic causes. Cobb's research has taken her on several oceanographic voyages around the tropical Pacific and caving expeditions of the rainforests of Borneo. Cobb's research group uses corals and cave stalagmites as archives of past climate change and investigates past climate variability over the last several centuries to several hundreds of thousands of years ago. In addition to generating high-resolution paleoclimate records, Cobb's research group also monitors modern climate variability, performs model analysis, and characterizes tropical Pacific climate variability. She and her team collected ancient coral fragments from the islands of Kiribati and Palmyra, aged them with uranium–thorium dating and then used the oxygen isotope ratio cycle to measure the intensity of El Niño events over the last 7,000 years. Cobb is on the editorial board of Geophysical Review Letters and acted as lead author on the Sixth Assessment Report of the Intergovernmental Panel on Climate Change. In May, 2022, Brown University announced the appointment of Cobb as the director of the Institute at Brown for Environment and Society.

== Awards and recognition ==
- In 2007, she won the NSF CAREER award and the Georgia Tech Education Partnership Award
- In 2008, Cobb was recognised as one of the nation's top young scientists, winning the Presidential Early Career Award for Scientists and Engineers (PECASE)
- In 2009, Cobb received a Kavli 'Frontiers of Science' Fellowship
- In 2019, Cobb was awarded the 2020 Hans Oeschger Medal by the European Geosciences Union
- In 2023, she was elected a Fellow of the American Geophysical Union
- 2025 - Friend of the Planet award, National Center for Science Education

== Policy and public engagement ==
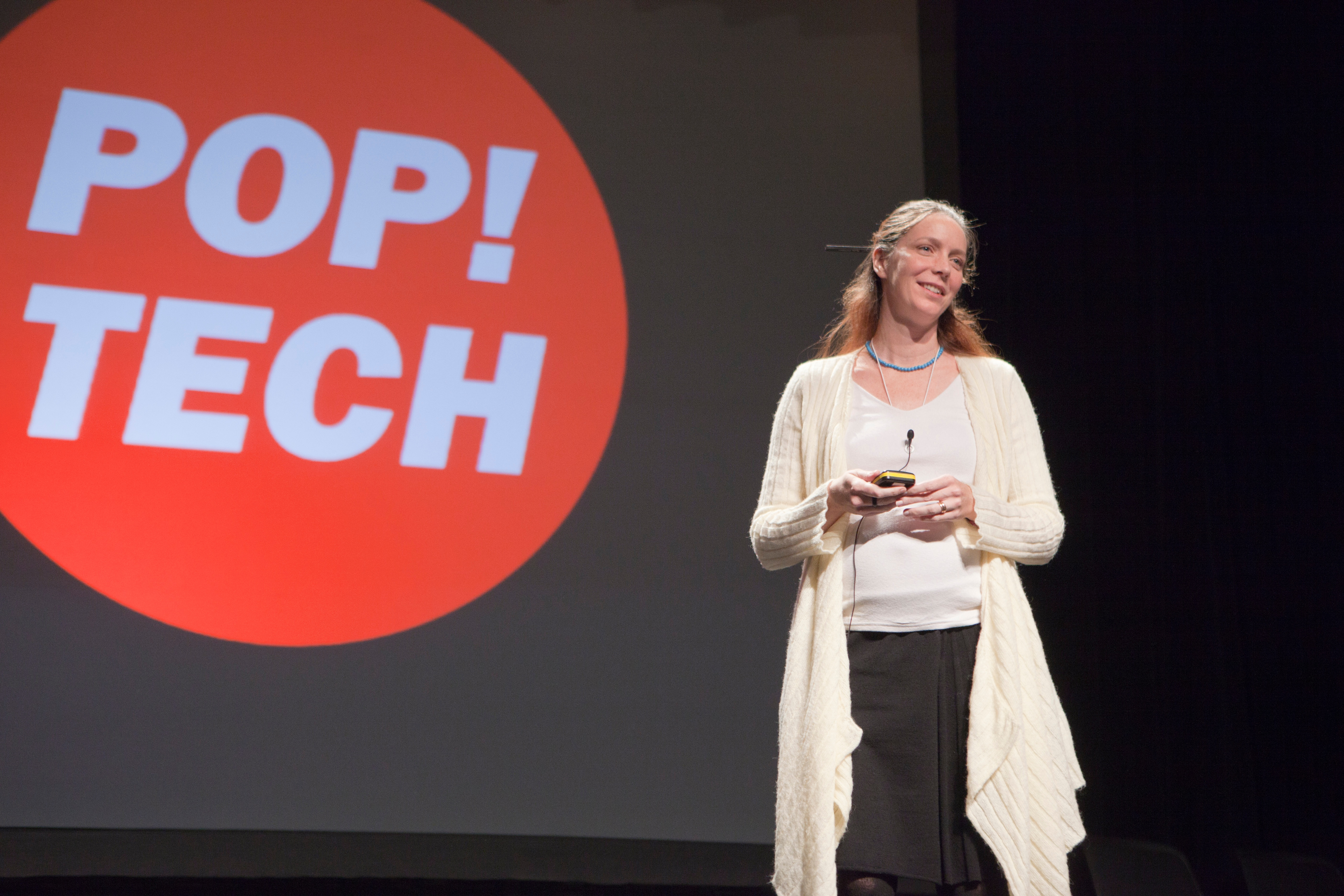
Cobb in 2010 speaking at PopTech

Cobb sits on the American Association of Advancement of Science Climate Science Panel, the international CLIVAR Pacific Panel and the international PAGES-CLIVAR intersection panel. She is on the advisory council for the AAAS Leshner Institute for Public Engagement.

Cobb is an advocate for outreach with communities, and regularly lectures to schools, colleges and other public groups, on climate science. She has been involved with policy and is the writer of several public interest articles on climate change, trying to inspire other climate scientists to speak up in international debate. She has appeared on Showtime's documentary "Years of Living Dangerously". On Real Scientists, Cobb makes her case for studying the paleoclimate: "The instrumental record of climate is far too short to identify some of the most important changes in climate under greenhouse forcing. Paleoclimate data is coming to the rescue, looking at past droughts, extreme events, and sea level change". Cobb gave a presentation at the March for Science in Atlanta, Georgia, in April 2017.

In February 2019, Cobb testified before the House Committee on Natural Resources for the hearing, "Climate Change: Impacts and the Need to Act." In this testimony, she described how the 2016 Pacific Ocean El Niño wiped out 90 percent of the corals in her study site, saying, "I had a front-row seat to the carnage." She underscored the severity and clear increases in the effects of climate change, noting that many scientists she talked with have been willing to collaborate with lawmakers on climate change.

== Diversity ==
At Georgia Tech, she is an ADVANCE Professor for "Institutional Diversity", part of the National Science Foundation's efforts to increase representation and advancement of women in science and engineering.
