= John F. B. Mitchell =

British climatologist (born 1948)

John Francis Brake Mitchell OBE FRS (born 7 October 1948) is a British climatologist and climate modeller.

He studied Applied Mathematics at Queen's University Belfast, graduating in 1970 and staying on to gain a PhD in Theoretical Physics in 1973.

In 1978, he was appointed head of the Climate Change group in what is now the Met Office's Hadley Centre for Climate Prediction and Research. He was Chief Scientist from 2002 to 2008 and Director of Climate Science from 2008 to 2010. For many years he was the most cited scientist regarding the topic of global warming.

He was a convening lead author for the first and third IPCC Working Group I reports and lead author for the second. He was also chair of the World Meteorological Organization JSC/CLIVAR Working Group on Climate Modelling and a member of WMO Executive Council from 2005 to 2008.

In 2014 he took a part-time position as Principal Research Fellow, advising the Met Office Chief Scientist on climate change and also became a visiting professor at the University of Reading.

Mitchell was awarded the OBE in the 2001 Birthday Honours.

== Awards ==
- 2011 Symons Gold Medal
- 2004 Hans Oeschger Medal
- 1997/8 Shared the Norbert Gerbier-Mumm Prize with other colleagues.
