= Christof Mauch =

German historian (born 1960)

Christof Mauch (born 9 February 1960 in Sindelfingen, Germany) is a German historian, presently director of the Rachel Carson Center for Environment and Society in Munich, Germany, and since 2007 professor of American Cultural History and Transatlantic Relations at LMU Munich. From 1999 to 2007, Mauch was the director of the German Historical Institute in Washington D.C.. Mauch received his D.Phil. in Modern German literature from the University of Tübingen in 1990, and his D.Phil. in modern history in 1998 from the University of Cologne. He has published and edited many books in the fields of U.S. and German history and environmental history. From 2009 to 2011, Mauch was chair of the board of directors of the International Consortium of Environmental History Organizations (ICEHO) and from 2011 to 2013 president of the European Society for Environmental History. In May 2013, he was appointed honorary professor at Renmin University, Beijing, China. In the same year, he was awarded the Carl-von-Carlowitz Prize of Germany's Council for Sustainable Development, and in 2017, he received the Award for a Distinguished Career in Public Environmental History from the American Society for Environmental History.

== Recent publications ==
- Die 101 wichtigsten Fragen: Amerikanische Geschichte [The 101 most important questions: American History], Munich: C.H.Beck 2008, 2nd ed. 2016
- Geschichte der USA [History of the U.S.], Tübingen/ Basel: UTB Francke, 6th edition 2008 (with Jürgen Heideking)
- Shadow War Against Hitler: The Covert Operations of America's Wartime Secret Intelligence Service. Translated by Jeremiah M. Riemer, New York: Columbia University Press 2003 (Paperback 2005)
- Natural Disasters, Cultural Responses: Case Studies Toward a Global Environmental History, Lanham, MD: Lexington Books 2009 (Ed. with Christian Pfister)
- Beyond the Windshield: Landscapes and Roads in Europe and North America, Athens, OH: Ohio University Press 2008 (Ed. with Thomas Zeller)
- Rivers in History, Pittsburgh: University of Pittsburgh Press 2008 (Ed. with Thomas Zeller)
- Shades of Green: Global Environmentalism in Historical Perspective, Rowman & Littlefield 2006 (Ed. with Nathan Stoltzfus and Doug Weiner)
- Adolf Cluss, Architect: From Germany to America, New York: Berghahn Books in collaboration with Historical Society of Washington D.C. 2005 (Ed. with Alan Lessoff) [winner of the 2006 Victorian Society of America Henry-Russell Hitchcock Book Award]
- Berlin – Washington. Capital Cities, Cultural Representations, and National Identities. 1800-2000, Cambridge/ New York: Cambridge University Press 2005 (Ed. with Andreas Daum)
- Nature in German History, New York/ Oxford: Berghahn Books 2004, (Ed.)
- German-Jewish Identities in America. From the Civil War to the Present, Madison, WI: University of Wisconsin Press/ Publications of the Max Kade Institute 2003 (Ed.. with Joseph Salmons)
