= Françoise Gasse =

- Born: 1942
- Died: 22 April 2014 (aged 71–72)
- Occupation(s): paleobiologist, paleoclimatologist and paleohydrologist

Françoise Gasse (French pronunciation: [fʁɑ̃swaz ɡas]; born 1942; died 22 April 2014) was a French paleobiologist, paleoclimatologist and paleohydrologist. She specialized in environmental phenomena and more specifically the study of lacustrine sediments from ancient lakes in Africa and Asia region. F. Gasse had special impact in starting the first research projects that aim at rebuilding paleoclimatic variations and Quaternary paleoenvironments in different regions and precisely: the Sahara and the Sahel, East Africa and Madagascar, Western (Caspian) and Southern (Tibet), and in the Middle East (Lebanon). She was a member of PAGES (Past Global Changes)/ The International Geosphere-Biosphere Programme.

== Career ==
She earned her PhD in geology in 1975 from the University of Paris with a thesis on the evolution of Lake Abhé. Her work became the first continuous dated African Pliocene-Pleistocene diatom record. She entered the French National Centre for Scientific Research (CNRS) and joined the Hydrology and Isotope Geochemistry lab of the Paris-Sud University in 1986, under the direction of professor Jean-Charles Fontes. She moved to the Centre de Recherche et d’Enseignement de Géosciences de l’Environnement (CEREGE) in 1998.

In 2005 she became the first woman to receive the Vega Medal from the Swedish Society for Anthropology and Geography.

In 2010, she was awarded the Hans Oeschger Medal bestowed by the European Union of Geosciences for her "contribution to the reconstruction of climate variability during the Holocene from continental archives and to a better understanding of climate mechanisms involved during this period."
