= Hans Oeschger Medal =

The Hans Oeschger Medal is an award bestowed by the European Geosciences Union (EGU) to recognise scientists who have made "outstanding achievements in ice research and/or short term climatic changes (past, present, future)." The award was established by the European Geophysical Society (EGS) in recognition of the scientific achievements of Professor Hans Oeschger. It was awarded by the EGS in 2002 and 2003, and subsequently by the EGU.

== List of recipients ==
Source: European Geosciences Union

| Year | Name | Organisation / Institution | Awarded for |
|---|---|---|---|
| 2021 | Sonia I. Seneviratne | ETH Zurich | |
| 2020 | Kim M. Cobb | | |
| 2019 | Edward J. Brook | Oregon State University | "for producing greenhouse-gas records from polar ice cores in unprecedented resolution that permitted the precise north-south synchronisation of climate signals and the identification of past variations in great detail." |
| 2018 | Hubertus Fischer | University of Bern | "for his innovative development and use of analytical techniques to measure chemical compounds and gas concentrations and their isotopic compositions in polar ice cores." |
| 2017 | Denis-Didier Rousseau | American Geophysical Union | "in recognition of his pioneering work in continental climate reconstruction by developing new proxies and combining them with innovative climate-model simulations." |
| 2016 | Paul A. Mayewski | Climate Change Institute | "in recognition of his outstanding contribution to ice core and climate research and his seminal contribution to ice core chemistry." |
| 2015 | not awarded | | |
| 2014 | Sherilyn C. Fritz | University of Nebraska–Lincoln | "Outstanding contribution in reconstructing and understanding past periods of drought in North America, past hydrological changes in tropical and mid-latitude regions from lake sediments, and for her thorough approach to deciphering natural climate impact from human-induced landscape changes." |
| 2013 | Miryam Bar-Matthews | Geological Survey of Israel | "Pioneering contribution and leadership in the field of terrestrial palaeoclimate change using high resolution cave speleothem records, and for her outstanding contribution to our understanding of the climatic and environmental context of human history and pre-history." |
| 2012 | Michael E. Mann | Pennsylvania State University | "Significant contributions to understanding decadal-centennial scale climate change over the last two millennia and for pioneering techniques to synthesize patterns and northern hemispheric time series of past climate using proxy data reconstructions." |
| 2011 | Robert J. Delmas | LGGE Laboratoire de glaciologie et géophysique de l'environnement | "Seminal contributions to ice core glaciochemistry and his pioneering research on reconstructing changes in the composition of the atmosphere." |
| 2010 | Françoise Gasse | CEREGE (Centre Européen de Recherche et d'Enseignement en Géosciences de l'Environnement) | "Contribution[s] to the reconstruction of climate variability during the Holocene from continental archives and to a better understanding of climate mechanisms involved during this period." |
| 2009 | Thomas Stocker | University of Bern | "Contributions to the understanding of the role of the oceans in past climate changes and for his involvement in ice core studies." |
| 2008 | Dominique Raynaud | Laboratoire de Glaciologie et Géophysique de l'Environnement (LGGE) | "Contribution to the reconstruction of past atmospheric composition over the last 800,000 years from Antarctic ice cores and to the understanding of the link between greenhouse gases and climate." |
| 2007 | Raymond S. Bradley | University of Massachusetts Amherst | "Contribution[s] to paleoclimate reconstruction from continental archives and for being instrumental in the multi-proxy approach leading to the quantification of climate change over the last millennium." |
| 2006 | Bernhard Stauffer | University of Bern | "Contributions to ice core research, in particular for methodological developments, greenhouse gas measurements and ice chemistry." |
| 2005 | Laurent Labeyrie | | "Contribution[s] to quaternary palaeoclimatology based on isotopic measurements on deep-sea cores and for his key rôle in the International Marine Global Change Study (IMAGES)." |
| 2004 | John F. B. Mitchell | Met Office | "Pioneer research in using atmosphere-ocean general circulation models to understand natural and anthropogenic influences on climatic changes." |
| 2003 | Sigfus Johnsen | | "For his outstanding contributions to ice core research through the modeling of water isotopes and their use for paleoclimate reconstruction." |
| 2002 | Philip D. Jones | Climatic Research Unit, UEA | "For his remarkable contribution and sustained effort in reconstructing the climate of the last 250 years at the global and regional scales." |

== See also ==
- List of geophysics awards
