= Nathan Stoltzfus =

American historian

Nathan Stoltzfus is an American historian of modern Europe who specializes in the history of Nazi Germany, the Holocaust, civil resistance, and the relationship between society and authoritarian rule. He was the Dorothy and Jonathan Rintels Professor emeritus of Holocaust Studies at Florida State University, where he taught in the Department of History from 1994 until his retirement in 2024. His research examines how social conventions, religious traditions, family relationships, and public opinion influenced the policies of the Nazi regime and the responses of ordinary Germans. He is particularly known for his research on the Rosenstrasse protests of 1943, in which non-Jewish women demonstrated in Berlin for the release of their Jewish husbands detained by the Gestapo. In Resistance of the Heart: Intermarriage and the Rosenstrasse Protest in Nazi Germany (1996), he argued that the demonstrations contributed to the release of approximately 2,000 Jewish men in mixed marriages. His subsequent book, Hitler's Compromises: Coercion and Consensus in Nazi Germany (2016), examined the use of political concessions alongside coercion in Hitler's efforts to maintain public support. His interpretation of the Rosenstrasse events became the subject of scholarly debate among historians. In 2018, he co-founded the Rosenstrasse Civil Courage Foundation with Mordecai Paldiel.

== Biography ==
Stoltzfus was born in Kent County, Delaware, and grew up on a dairy farm. His small church community of the Conservative Amish Mennonite Conference founded the Greenwood Mennonite School of ten grades which Stoltzfus attended, graduating in a class of five students in 1970. The community with its strict codes of separation from “the world” seeded his scholarly interests in nonconformity and political violence.

Stoltzfus was educated at Goshen College in Goshen, Indiana, (B.A. 1978) and Harvard University (PhD, 1993).

== Career ==
For his scholarly work he has received grants to live and research in East as well as West Berlin from the Fulbright Program, IREX (International Research & Exchanges Board), the Albert Einstein Institution, the Harry Frank Guggenheim Foundation, the Friedrich Ebert Stiftung, the German-American Center for Visiting Scholars, the German Academic Exchange Commission (DAAD) among others. He joined Florida State University, where he served as Assistant Professor and Associate Professor in the Department of History before being appointed the Dorothy and Jonathan Rintels Professor of Holocaust Studies. His earlier academic appointments included positions as Senior Lecturer at Suffolk University and Teaching Fellow at Harvard University. He has also taught in London and Valencia, Spain. Before entering academia, Stoltzfus was Director of Internal Communications for the Assistant Secretary for Indian Affairs at the United States Department of the Interior, and as editor of the American Indian Journal in Washington, D.C.

== Publications ==
Stoltzfus is the author or editor of nine books and is published in general intellectual publications including among others in Die Zeit, The Atlantic, Der Spiegel, The Daily Beast, The Jerusalem Post, American Scholar. His Harvard dissertation “Social Limitations on the Nazi Dictatorship” was co-winner of the Ernst Fraenkel Prize in Contemporary History and published as Resistance of the Heart: Intermarriage and the Rosenstrasse Protest in Nazi Germany (WW Norton 1996).

Joan Bakewell selected it as a New Statesman Book of the year, and the German translation (Foreword by German Foreign Minister, Joschka Fischer) placed second on Germany’s Bestenliste, The Swedish translation was a main selection for the Clio-Den Swedish Book Club in March-April, 2004. Greek and French translations followed.

Other published books include: Hitler’s Compromises: Coercion and Consensus in Nazi Germany (Yale University Press, 2016); Social Outsiders in Nazi Germany (Princeton University Press, 2001) co-edited with Robert Gellately; Shades of Green: Environmental Activism around the Globe (Rowman & Littlefield, 2006), co-edited with Christof Mauch and Doug Weiner; Courageous Resistance: The Power of Ordinary People (Palgrave MacMillan, 2007), co-authored with five professors of history, political science, and sociology; Nazi Crimes and the Law (Cambridge University Press, 2008), co-edited with Henry Friedlander; Protest in Hitler's “National Community”: Popular Unrest and the Nazi Response (Berghahn Books, 2015), co-edited with Birgit Maier-Katkin; Women Defying Hitler: Rescue and Resistance Under the Nazis (Bloomsbury Publishing, 2021) co-edited with Mordecai Paldiel and Judy Baumel Schwartz; The Power of Populism and People. Resistance and Protest in the Modern World (Bloomsbury Publishing, 2021) co-edited with Christopher Osmar.
