= Hans Oeschger =

Swiss climatologist (1927–1998)

Hans Oeschger (2 April 1927, Ottenbach – 25 December 1998, Bern) was a Swiss climatologist. He founded the Division of Climate and Environmental Physics at the Physics Institute of the University of Bern in 1963 and served as its director until his retirement in 1992.

Oeschger was the first to date the "age" of Pacific deep water. The Oeschger counter, developed by his team, was a leading instrument for measuring the activity of naturally occurring radioisotopes (^{3}H, ^{14}C, ^{26}Al, ^{37}Ar, ^{39}Ar, ^{81}Kr, ^{85}Kr).

He was a pioneer in ice core research, and in collaboration with his colleagues, he was the first to measure the glacial-interglacial changes in atmospheric CO_{2}. Their 1979 study demonstrated that atmospheric CO_{2} levels during the glacial period were nearly 50% lower than today.

Along with Chester C. Langway and Willi Dansgaard, Oeschger documented a series of abrupt climate changes in the Greenland ice cores, now known as Dansgaard–Oeschger events.

Oeschger expressed concerns about the potential increase in the greenhouse effect due to rising CO_{2} levels. He said: “The worst for me would be, if there were serious changes in the next 5 to 10 years and we scientists are helpless and did not have the courage to point at these dangerous developments early.”

He was a lead author of the First Assessment Report of the Intergovernmental Panel on Climate Change.

The European Geophysical Society established the Hans Oeschger Medal in his honour in 2001.

The centre of excellence for climate research at the University of Bern (Oeschger Centre for Climate Change Research), which was founded in 2007, is named after Hans Oeschger, as is Oeschger Bluff, a cliff in Antarctica.

== Awards ==
- Urey Medal, 1987
- Seligman Crystal, 1991
- Marcel Benoist Prize, 1990
- Tyler Prize for Environmental Achievement, 1996
- Roger Revelle Medal of the American Geophysical Union, 1997
