= Thomas Stocker =

Swiss climate scientist

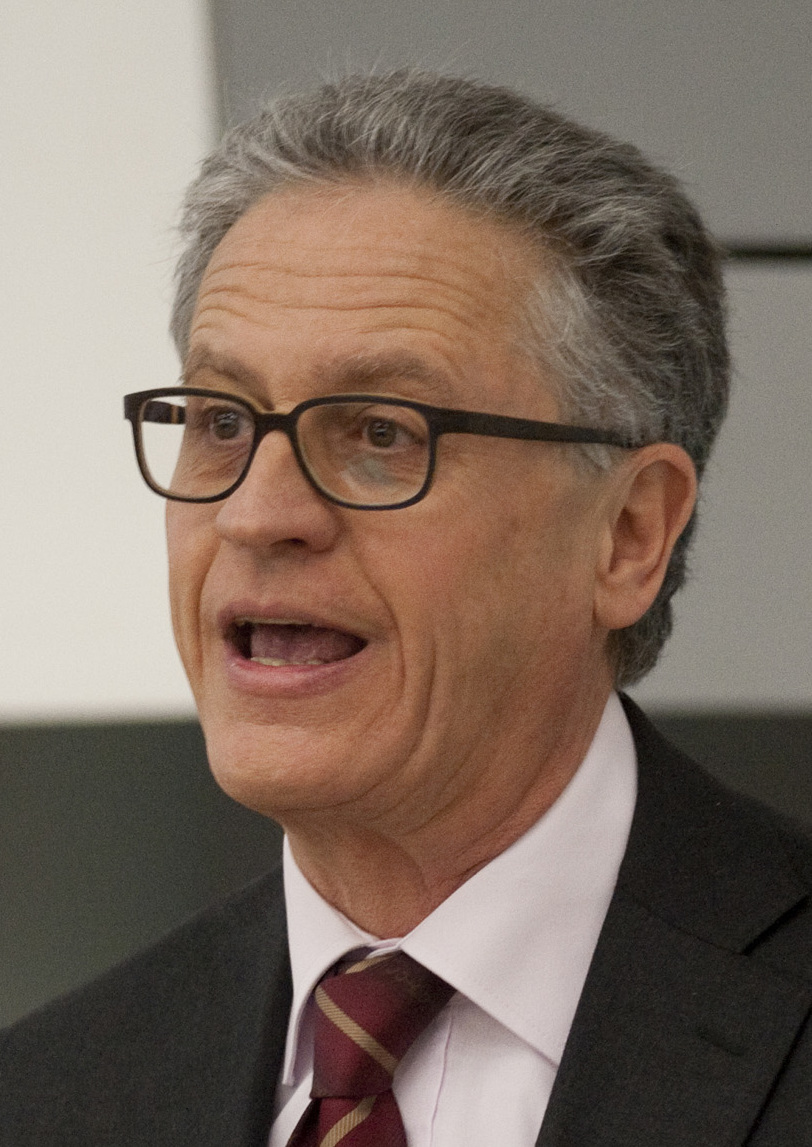
- Born: 1959 (age 66–67)
- Occupations: Professor of Climate and Environmental Physics, University of Bern
- Awards: National Latsis Prize; Marcel Benoist Prize; Hans Oeschger Medal

Academic background
- Education: ETH Zurich

Academic work
- Discipline: Climate and Environmental Physics

Thomas F. Stocker (born 1959) is a Swiss climate scientist.

Born in Zürich, Stocker obtained a degree in physics at the ETH Zurich. He was active in research at the University College London, at McGill University in Montreal and at Columbia University in New York. Since 1993, he has been a professor and head of the department of Climate and Environmental Physics at the University of Bern.

The focus of Stocker's research is the development of models of climate change based on, among other, the analysis of ice cores from the polar regions. He significantly contributed to creating the "hockey stick graph" that shows a growing increase of global mean temperatures in recent times. Since 1998, he contributes to the reports of the Intergovernmental Panel on Climate Change, and is co-chairman of the IPCC Working Group I (assessing scientific aspects of the climate system and climate change) from 2008 to 2015.

In 1993, Stocker was awarded the Swiss National Science Foundation's National Latsis Prize, in 2009 the Hans Oeschger Medal of the European Geosciences Union and in 2017 the Marcel Benoist Prize. For 2023 he received the BBVA Foundation Frontiers of Knowledge Award.

He is a Fellow of the American Geophysical Union and a member of the Academia Europaea. In 2019, Stocker became a member of the German Academy of Sciences Leopoldina.

Stocker is featured in the film Taking Earth's Temperature: Delving into Climate's Past.
