= Robert Gellately =

American-Canadian historian (born 1943)

- Born: 1943 (age 82–83); St. John's, Dominion of Newfoundland, British Empire
- Awards: Alexander von Humboldt Foundation Fellowships; Honorary Litt. D., Memorial University of Newfoundland (2006); Bertelsmann Visiting Professorship, University of Oxford (2004–2005)

Academic background
- Education: B.A., Memorial University of Newfoundland; B.Ed., Memorial University of Newfoundland; M.A., Memorial University of Newfoundland (1970); Ph.D., London School of Economics (1974)
- Alma mater: Memorial University of Newfoundland; London School of Economics

Academic work
- Discipline: History
- Sub-discipline: Modern European history; Nazi Germany; Soviet history; Holocaust studies
- Institutions: Cornell University; Huron University College; Clark University; Florida State University (2003–2024)
- Main interests: Nazi Germany; Gestapo; Soviet Union under Stalin; Political denunciation; Consent and coercion in dictatorships
- Notable works: The Gestapo and German Society (1990); Backing Hitler (2001); Lenin, Stalin and Hitler (2007); Stalin's Curse (2013); Hitler's True Believers (2020)

Robert Gellately (born 1943) is an American and Canadian historian specializing in Nazi Germany, the Holocaust, and secondarily the Soviet Union under Lenin and Stalin. His research on the Gestapo argued that Nazi terror relied heavily on denunciations by ordinary German citizens rather than omnipresent state surveillance. His books include The Gestapo and German Society (1990), Backing Hitler (2001), Lenin, Stalin and Hitler (2007), Stalin's Curse, (2013), and Hitler's True Believers (2020). His work has been translated into more than thirty languages.

== Education ==
Gellately earned his B.A., B.Ed., and M.A. (1970) at Memorial University of Newfoundland and his Ph.D. (1974) at the London School of Economics. He completed post-doctoral studies in Germany as a fellow of the Alexander von Humboldt Foundation.

== Academic career ==
Gellately began teaching at Cornell University, then spent 22 years at Huron University College (now Huron University) at the University of Western Ontario. From 1998 to 2003, he held the Strassler Family Professorship in Holocaust History at Clark University. In 2003, he joined Florida State University as the Earl Ray Beck Professor of History. He retired in 2024.

== Awards ==
- Senior Fellowships, Alexander von Humboldt Foundation
- Grants, Harry Frank Guggenheim Foundation
- Grants, Social Sciences and Humanities Research Council of Canada
- Bertelsmann Visiting Professor of Twentieth Century Jewish Politics and History, University of Oxford, 2004–2005
- Honorary Doctor of Letters, Memorial University of Newfoundland, 2006

== Scholarship ==
=== Early work ===
Gellately's first book, The Politics of Economic Despair: Shopkeepers and German Politics, 1890–1914 (1974), analyzed shopkeeper politics in Imperial Germany.

=== The Gestapo studies ===
In 1988, Gellately published "The Gestapo and German Society: Political Denunciation in the Gestapo Case Files" in The Journal of Modern History. This archival research formed the basis for The Gestapo and German Society: Enforcing Racial Policy, 1933–1945 (Oxford University Press, 1990), which argued that the Gestapo, a relatively small organization, functioned through denunciations by ordinary citizens rather than through omnipresent surveillance.

A 1996 article, "Denunciations in Twentieth-Century Germany: Aspects of Self-Policing in the Third Reich and the German Democratic Republic," extended this analysis to include East Germany.

Backing Hitler: Consent and Coercion in Nazi Germany (Oxford University Press, 2001) analyzed how the Nazi dictatorship maintained popular support. The book was selected by book clubs in North America and the United Kingdom and has been translated into German, Dutch, Spanish, Czech, Portuguese, Italian, Japanese, and French.

=== Comparative dictatorship ===
Lenin, Stalin and Hitler: The Age of Social Catastrophe (Alfred A. Knopf, 2007) compared the three dictators. Stalin's Curse: Battling for Communism in War and Cold War (Alfred A. Knopf, 2013) traced Stalin's role in the Cold War and Soviet expansion in Eastern Europe.

Hitler's True Believers: How Ordinary People Became Nazis (Oxford University Press, 2020) analyzed paths to Nazi ideology among ordinary Germans.

=== Edited volumes ===
Gellately co-edited Accusatory Practices: Denunciation in Modern European History, 1789–1989 (University of Chicago Press, 1997) with Sheila Fitzpatrick, Social Outsiders in Nazi Germany (Princeton University Press, 2001) with Nathan Stoltzfus, and The Specter of Genocide: Mass Murder in Historical Perspective (Cambridge University Press, 2003) with Ben Kiernan.

He edited The Nuremberg Interviews: An American Psychiatrist's Conversations with the Defendants and Witnesses (Alfred A. Knopf, 2004), presenting documents by psychiatrist Leon Goldensohn from the Nuremberg trials, and The Oxford Illustrated History of the Third Reich (Oxford University Press, 2018).

== Bibliography ==
=== Monographs ===
- The Politics of Economic Despair: Shopkeepers and German Politics, 1890–1914 (London, 1974)
- The Gestapo and German Society: Enforcing Racial Policy 1933–1945 (Oxford University Press, 1990)
- Backing Hitler: Consent and Coercion in Nazi Germany (Oxford University Press, 2001)
- Lenin, Stalin and Hitler: The Age of Social Catastrophe (Alfred A. Knopf; Jonathan Cape, 2007)
- Stalin's Curse: Battling for Communism in War and Cold War (Alfred A. Knopf; Oxford University Press, 2013)
- Hitler's True Believers: How Ordinary People Became Nazis (Oxford University Press, 2020)

=== Edited volumes ===
- Accusatory Practices: Denunciation in Modern European History, 1789–1989 (University of Chicago Press, 1997), with Sheila Fitzpatrick
- Social Outsiders in Nazi Germany (Princeton University Press, 2001), with Nathan Stoltzfus
- The Specter of Genocide: Mass Murder in Historical Perspective (Cambridge University Press, 2003), with Ben Kiernan
- The Nuremberg Interviews (Alfred A. Knopf, 2004)
- The Oxford Illustrated History of the Third Reich (Oxford University Press, 2018)
- The Oxford History of the Third Reich (Oxford University Press, 2023)

=== Selected articles ===
- "Das sozialistische Versprechen des Nationalsozialismus und die Doppelkrise des Kapitalismus und der Demokratie. In Thomas Weber" (ed.), Als die Demokratie starb. Die Machtergreifung der Nationalsozialisten — Geschichte und Gegenwart (Freiburg, Germany, 2022), 75-88.
- "The Persecution of Social Outsiders and the Consolidation of Hitler's Dictatorship, 1933-39" (published in Portuguese). In Denise Rollemberg, Marcelo Bittencourt, Norberto Ferreras, & Samantha Viz Quadrat (eds.), A construção social dos regimes autoritários : legitimidade, consenso e consentimento no século XX: Europa (Rio de Janeiro, 2011), 204-42. doi:10.5949/liverpool/9780859897457.003.0004
- "The Third Reich, the Holocaust and Plans for Serial Genocide". In Robert Gellately, & Ben Kiernan (eds), The Specter of Genocide: Mass Murder and other Mass Crimes in Historical Perspective (Cambridge University Press, 2003), 241-63.
- "Between Exploitation, Rescue and Annihilation: Reviewing Schindler's List". Central European History, Vol. 26, No. 4 (1993) 475-89. JSTOR 4546374
- "The Gestapo and German Society: Political Denunciation in the Gestapo Case Files," The Journal of Modern History Vol. 60, No. 4 (December 1988)
- "Denunciations in Twentieth-Century Germany: Aspects of Self-Policing in the Third Reich and the German Democratic Republic," The Journal of Modern History Vol. 68, No. 4 (December 1996)

Gellately's work has been translated into more than thirty languages.
