= Eduardo Zorita =

Spanish paleoclimatologist

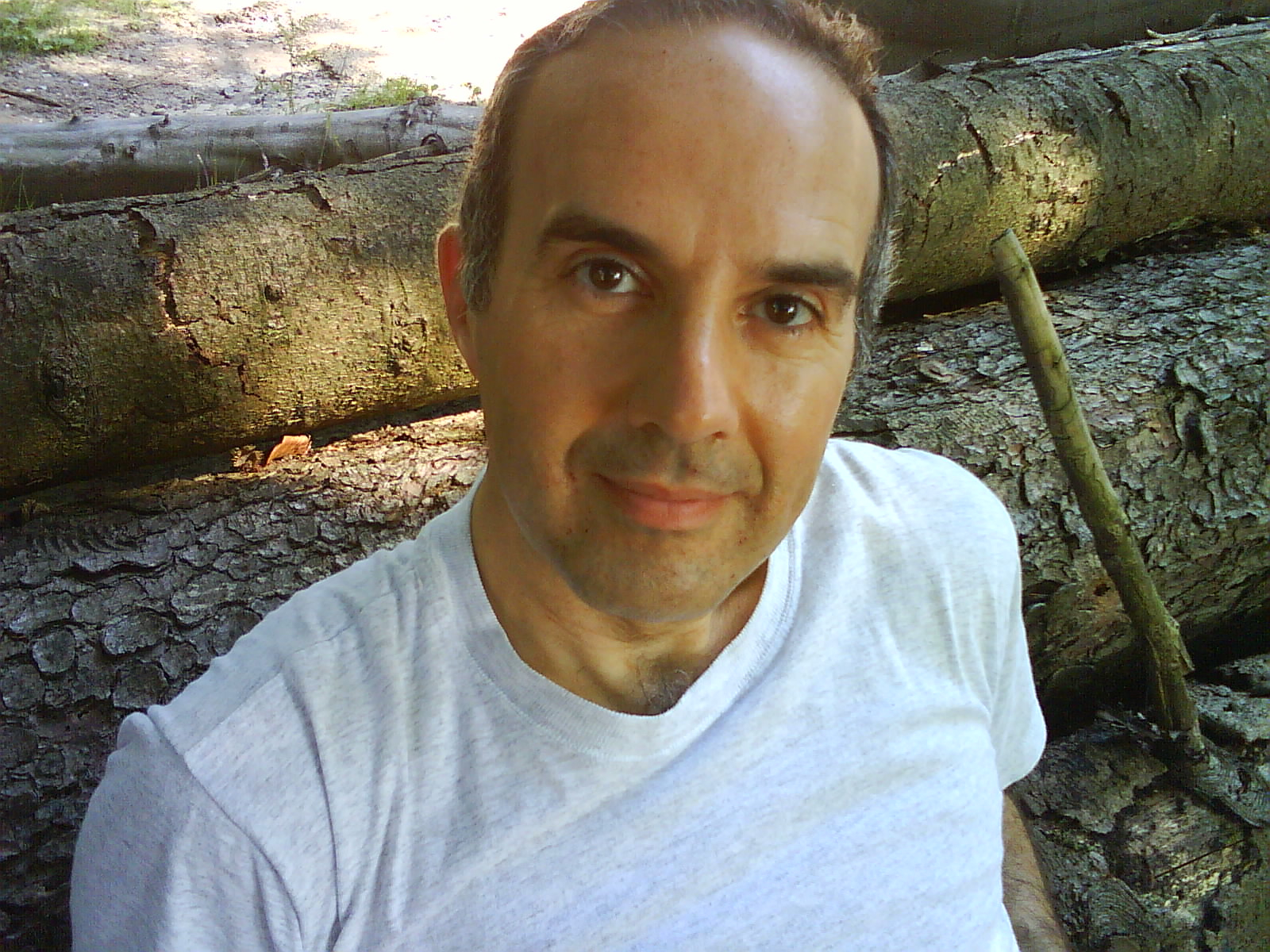
Eduardo Zorita

Eduardo Zorita (born 1961 in Madrid) is a Spanish paleoclimatologist. As of 2010, he is a Senior Scientist at the Institute for Coastal Research, GKSS Research Centre in Geesthacht, Germany, where he has worked since 1996. Zorita is review editor of the journal Climate Research.

== Professional life ==
Zorita received his Ph.D. in solid state physics at the University of Zaragoza in 1988, and then held a postdoctoral appointment at the Max Planck Institute for Meteorology, Hamburg. He was an Associate Researcher at the Laboratoire de Océanographie Dynamique et de Climatologie (LOCEAN), Pierre-and-Marie-Curie University, Paris, 1994–95.

Zorita is a regular contributor to Die Klimazwiebel, a climate science blog operated by Hans von Storch, Zorita and other climate scientists.

In 2013 he was part of a research group confirming the hockey stick graph reconstruction.

== Climatic Research Unit email controversy ==
At the outset of the Climatic Research Unit email controversy (Climategate) Zorita published his opinion on his personal web site. This was republished by The Wall Street Journal on 5 December 2009:

I may confirm what has been written in other places: research in some areas of climate science has been and is full of machination, conspiracies, and collusion, as any reader can interpret from the CRU-files. They depict a realistic, I would say even harmless, picture of what the real research in the area of the climate of the past millennium has been in the last years. The scientific debate has been in many instances hijacked to advance other agendas. I [do not] think anthropogenic climate change is a hoax. On the contrary, it is a question which we have to be very well aware of. But I am also aware that in this thick atmosphere—and I am not speaking of greenhouse gases now—editors, reviewers and authors of alternative studies, analysis, interpretations, even based on the same data we have at our disposal, have been bullied and subtly blackmailed. In this atmosphere, Ph D students are often tempted to tweak their data so as to fit the "politically correct picture". Some, or many issues, about climate change are still not well known. Policy makers should be aware of the attempts to hide these uncertainties under a unified picture. I had the "pleasure" to experience all this in my area of research.

—

Zorita set up the Klimazwiebel blog shortly afterwards, on 9 December 2009. In a 2012 interview with Hans von Storch, Zorita said "Climategate did not show that the essentials of climate science were wrong or that anthropogenic climate change is the result of a conspiracy. It did show that some scientists were impelled to present a clean story, cleaner than it really is, and in doing so they went a bit too far." He felt that in trying to present a clear message, scientists had lost public credibility, but independent groups checking work which appeared compromised found that the original conclusions were in order. In particular, the main surface temperature datasets which had been called into question were confirmed by the Muller et al. data analysis.

== Selected publications ==
- Frank, D.; Esper, J.; Zorita, E.; Wilson, R. (2010). "A noodle, hockey stick, and spaghetti plate: A perspective on high-resolution paleoclimatology". Wiley Interdisciplinary Reviews: Climate Change. 1 (4): 507. Bibcode:2010WIRCC...1..507F. doi:10.1002/wcc.53. S2CID 16524970.
- Zorita, E. (2010). "European temperature records of the past five centuries based on documentary/instrumental information compared to climate simulations" (PDF). Climate Change. 101 (1–2): 143–168. Bibcode:2010ClCh..101..143Z. doi:10.1007/s10584-010-9824-7. S2CID 154874156. Archived from the original (PDF) on 2011-07-19.
- González-Rouco, J. F.; Beltrami, H.; Zorita, E.; Stevens, M. B. (2009). "Borehole climatology: A discussion based on contributions from climate modeling" (PDF). Climate of the Past. 5 (1): 97–127. Bibcode:2009CliPa...5...97G. doi:10.5194/cp-5-97-2009.
- Zorita, E.; Stocker, T. F.; von Storch, H. (2008). "How unusual is the recent series of warm years?" (PDF). Geophysical Research Letters. 35 (24): L24706. Bibcode:2008GeoRL..3524706Z. doi:10.1029/2008GL036228.
  - "Scientists Refute Argument Of Climate Skeptics". ScienceDaily (Press release). 10 January 2009.
- von Storch, H.; Zorita, E. (3 May 2007). "The decay of the hockey stick". Climate Feedback. Nature Climate Change. Archived from the original on 2 January 2011.
- von Storch, H.; Zorita, E.; Jones, J. M.; Dimitriev, Y.; González-Rouco, F.; Tett, S. F. (2004). "Reconstructing past climate from noisy data". Science. 306 (5696): 679–682. Bibcode:2004Sci...306..679V. doi:10.1126/science.1096109. PMID 15459344. S2CID 16329419.
- Zorita, E.; von Storch, H. (1999). "The Analog Method as a Simple Statistical Downscaling Technique: Comparison with More Complicated Methods". Journal of Climate. 12 (8): 2474. Bibcode:1999JCli...12.2474Z. doi:10.1175/1520-0442(1999)012<2474:TAMAAS>2.0.CO;2.
- von Storch, H.; Zorita, E.; Cubasch, U. (1993). "Downscaling of Global Climate Change Estimates to Regional Scales: An Application to Iberian Rainfall in Wintertime". Journal of Climate. 6 (6): 1161. Bibcode:1993JCli....6.1161V. doi:10.1175/1520-0442(1993)006<1161:DOGCCE>2.0.CO;2. hdl:21.11116/0000-0000-D54B-C.

== Sources and external links ==
- Eduardo Zorita's home page at the Institute for Coastal Research
- Die Klimazwiebel blog
- Zorita's Photostream at Flickr
