= IPCC supplementary report, 1992 =

The IPCC supplementary report of 1992 was published to contribute to the debate on the United Nations Framework Convention on Climate Change at the 1992 Earth Summit, held in Rio de Janeiro.

The report updated and revised some of the data contained in the IPCC First Assessment Report, and included six new climate change scenarios, including an update of the 1990 reference scenario.

The major conclusion was that research since 1990 did "not affect our fundamental understanding of the science of the greenhouse effect and either confirm or do not justify alteration of the major conclusions of the first IPCC scientific assessment". It noted that transient (time-dependent) simulations, which had been very preliminary in the FAR, were now improved, but did not include aerosol or ozone changes.

== See also ==
- 1992 in the environment
- Avoiding Dangerous Climate Change – international conference (2005)
- Individual and political action on climate change
- Business action on climate change
- Energy law
- Energy policy
- Energy conservation
- Global climate model
- Precautionary principle
- World energy resources and consumption
