= Gabriele Hegerl =

German climate Scientist (born 1962)

Gabriele Hegerl CBE FRS FRSE
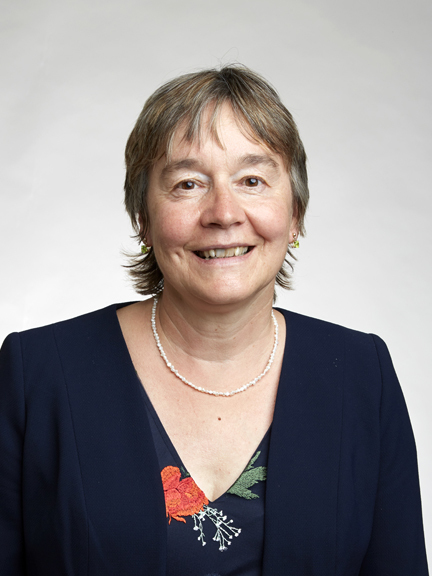
- Hegerl in 2018
- Born: Gabriele Clarissa Hegerl; 9 January 1962 (age 64); Munich, Germany
- Education: LMU Munich
- Spouse: Thomas Crowley (died)
- Children: 2
- Scientific career
- Fields: Climate science
- Workplaces: University of Edinburgh; Duke University; Texas A&M University; Max-Planck Institute for Meteorology, Hamburg
- Thesis: Numerische Lösung der kompressiblen zweidimensionalen Navier-Stokes-Gleichungen in einem zeitabhängigen Gebiet mit Hilfe energievermindernder Randbedingungen (1991)
- Website: www.research.ed.ac.uk/en/persons/gabi-hegerl

Gabriele Clarissa Hegerl CBE FRS FRSE (born 9 January 1962) is a German climate scientist. She is a professor of climate system science at the University of Edinburgh School of GeoSciences. Prior to 2007 she held research positions at Texas A&M University and at Duke University's Nicholas School of the Environment, during which time she was a co-ordinating lead author for the Intergovernmental Panel on Climate Change (IPCC) Fourth and Fifth Assessment Report.

== Early life and education ==
Hegerl was born on 9 January 1962 in Munich, Germany. She gained undergraduate and graduate degrees at LMU Munich in mathematics, finishing with a PhD in 1991, with a thesis using a numerical solution of the Navier–Stokes equations using boundary conditions.

== Research and career ==
Hegerl's research in the natural variability of climate and changes in climate due to natural and anthropogenic changes in radiative forcing (such as greenhouse warming, climate effects of volcanic eruptions and changes in solar radiation). Hegerl has also conducted some of the first research on the attribution of modern climate change to anthropogenic greenhouse gas emissions supervised by Klaus Hasselmann and Hans von Storch.

She led a 2006 study examining climate sensitivity, then commonly accepted as 1.5 to 4.5K in response to a doubling of atmospheric CO_{2}, to review observational studies suggesting that climate sensitivity could be as much as 7.7K or even exceed 9K. By using large-ensemble energy balance modelling to simulate temperature responses to historic changes in the radiative forcing effect of solar changes, volcanic eruptions and greenhouse gases, and comparing this to climate reconstructions, they produced an independent estimate that climate sensitivity was probably within the range of 1.5 to 6.2K. In an interview with The Washington Times, Hegerl said "Our reconstruction supports a lot of variability in the past".

She is a co-ordinating lead author on the IPCC Fourth Assessment Report for Working Group I in the chapter on "Understanding and Attributing Climate Change". Her 2006 reconstruction was cited in the chapter on "Paleoclimate" in support of the conclusion that the 20th century was likely to have been the warmest in the Northern Hemisphere for at least 1,300 years.

She was a member of a team which reviewed recent reconstructions of the temperature record of the past 1000 years, and in 2007 published their own reconstruction from proxies, finding that the maximum pre-industrial temperature in 1,000 years had been significantly exceeded by recent instrumental temperatures.

=== Publications ===
Hegerl's publications include:

- "Annular Modes in the Extratropical Circulation. Part II: Trends",
- "Simulation of the influence of solar radiation variations on the global climate with an ocean-atmosphere general circulation", by U Cubasch, R Voss, GC Hegerl, J Waszkewitz, T. J. Crowley – Climate Dynamics, 1997
- "Multi-fingerprint detection and attribution analysis of greenhouse gas, greenhouse gas-plus-aerosol and solar forced climate change", by G. C. Hegerl, K. Hasselmann, U. Cubasch, J. F. B. Mitchell, E. Roeckner, R. Voss and J. Waszkewitz
- "Detecting Greenhouse-Gas-Induced Climate Change with an Optimal Fingerprint Method",
- "Detection of climate change and attribution of causes", by JFB Mitchell, DJ Karoly, GC Hegerl, FW Zwiers, MR … – Climate Change 2001: The Scientific Basis, 2001
- "The Effect of Local Sea Surface Temperatures on Atmospheric Circulation over the Tropical Atlantic"
- "On multi-fingerprint detection and attribution of greenhouse gas- and aerosol forced climate change"

== Honours and awards ==
Hegerl was appointed CBE for "services to Climate Science" in the 2025 Birthday Honours List.

In 2013, she was elected a Fellow of the Royal Society of Edinburgh (FRSE) and in 2017 she was elected a Fellow of the Royal Society (FRS). In 2018 she became a member of the German Academy of Sciences Leopoldina.

In 2016, Professor Hegerl won the Hans Sigrist Prize "for her groundbreaking scientific work in this year’s prize field, 'The Human Fingerprint on the Earth System'" In 2018 she was made an honorary Doctor of Science by Leeds University.

== Personal life ==
Hegerl was married to Thomas Crowley and was later widowed. She has two sons, born in 2000 and 2003.
