= Jan Esper =

- Born: 1968 (age 57–58)
- Title: Professor and Head of Unit

Academic background
- Education: Rheinische Friedrich-Wilhelms-Universität Bonn

Academic work
- Discipline: Geography
- Institutions: Johannes Gutenberg Universität Mainz
- Main interests: Climate Change, Paleoclimatology, Urban Climate, Dendrochronology
- Website: Departmental Website

Jan Esper (born 1968) studied geography at the University of Bonn, where he later earned his doctorate. After a postdoc position at Columbia University in New York City, he continued his work on dendrochronology at the Swiss Federal Institute for Forest, Snow and Landscape Research (WSL), and qualified as a professor at the University of Bern. In 2018, Esper became a member of the Academy of Sciences and Literature. Since 2010, he has been a professor at the Department of Geography at Johannes Gutenberg University Mainz.

Esper's research focuses on global climate change, paleoclimate, urban climate and dendrochronology. In 2020, he received the European Research Council (ERC) Advanced Grant to improve climate reconstructions from tree rings. His research has notably included hockey stick graph temperature reconstructions.

== Selected bibliography ==
- Juckes, M.N.; Allen, M.R.; Briffa, Keith R.; Esper, Jan; Hegerl, G.C.; Moberg, Anders; Osborn, Timothy J.; Weber, S.L.; Zorita, Eduardo (2006). "Millennial temperature reconstruction intercomparison and evaluation". Climate of the Past Discussions. 2 (5): 1001–1049. doi:10.5194/cpd-2-1001-2006.
- Esper, Jan; Wilson, Robert J.S.; Frank, David C.; Moberg, Anders; Wanner, Heinz; Luterbacher, Jürg (2005). "Climate: past ranges and future changes" (PDF). Quaternary Science Reviews. 24 (20–21): 2164–2166. Bibcode:2005QSRv...24.2164E. doi:10.1016/j.quascirev.2005.07.001. Archived from the original (PDF) on 2006-12-30.
- Esper, Jan; Cook, Edward R.; Schweingruber, Fritz H. (2002). "Low-frequency signals in long tree-ring chronologies and the reconstruction of past temperature variability" (PDF). Science. 295 (5563): 2250–2253. Bibcode:2002Sci...295.2250E. doi:10.1126/science.1066208. PMID 11910106. S2CID 22184321. Archived from the original (PDF) on 2007-02-21.
- Esper, Jan; Frank, David C..; Wilson, Robert J.S. (2004). "Climate Reconstructions: Low-Frequency Ambition and High-Frequency Ratification". EOS. 85 (12): 113–120. Bibcode:2004EOSTr..85..113E. doi:10.1029/2004EO120002.
