= Silvia Frisia =

Italian researcher

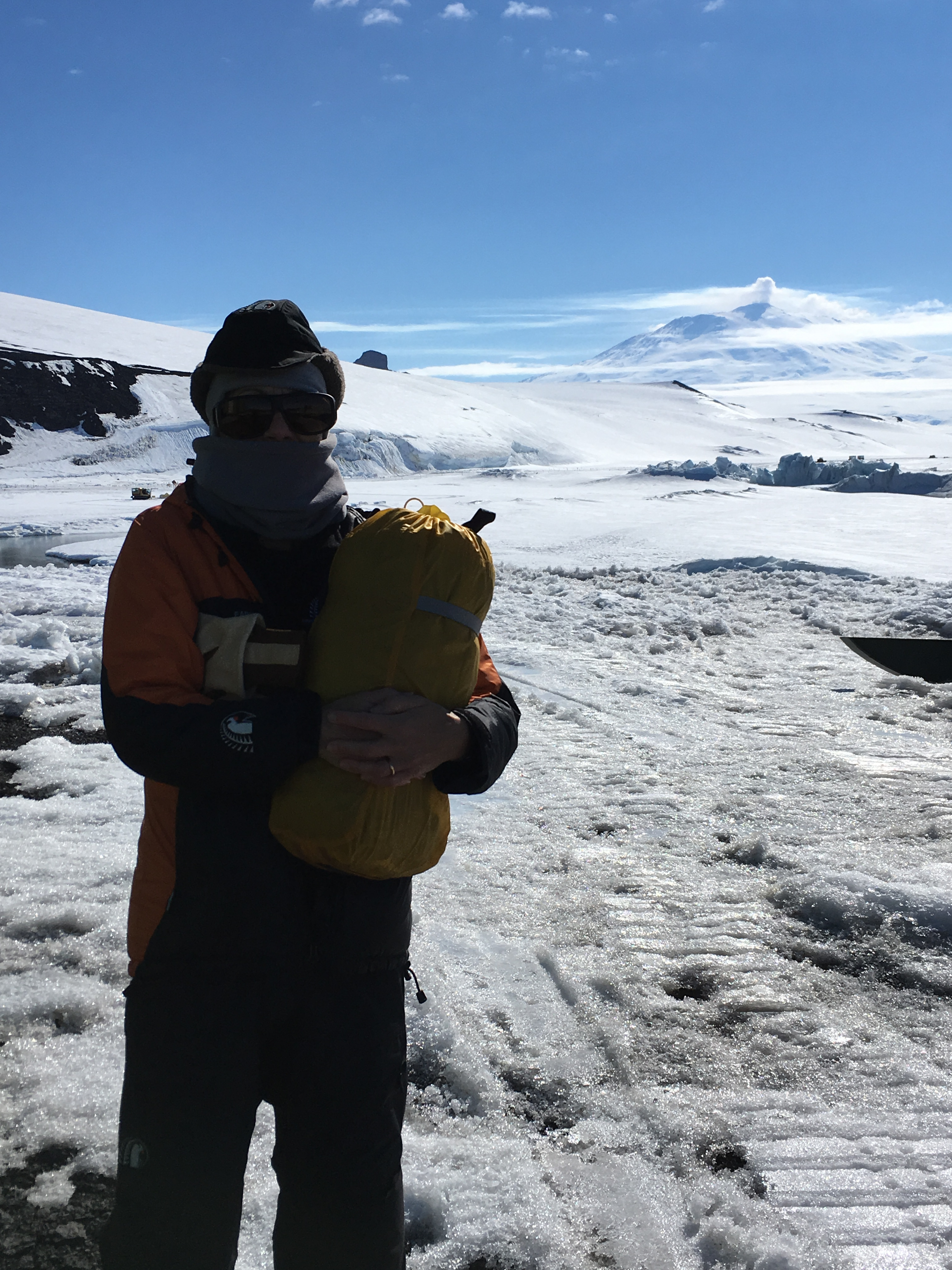
- Frisia doing fieldwork in Antarctica
- Born: 1954 (age 71–72); Milan, Italy
- Education: University of California, Berkeley; Università degli Studi
- Scientific career
- Workplaces: University of Newcastle

Silvia Frisia (born 1954) is a professor of Earth Science at the University of Newcastle, Australia. Frisia's work on carbonate crystals as archives of Earth's past environments and climates is recognised internationally. Her recent work has focussed on the role of Antarctic volcanism on the Southern Ocean.

== Early life and education ==
Silvia Frisia was born in Milan, Italy. After having worked as a carbonate sedimentologist in the geological service of Agip SpA, an Italian oil and gas exploration company, she studied carbonate crystallography at University of California, Berkeley under the supervision of Hans-Rudolf Wenk, where she received a Master of Science degree. She obtained a PhD in Earth Sciences, which was followed by a Post-Doctoral position at Università degli Studi in Milano that placed her at the forefront of the emerging and rapidly evolving field of speleothem-based palaeoclimatology.

== Career ==
Frisia's interests cover a broad field, from Transmission Electron Microscopy documentation of processes occurring at the nanometre-scale in carbonate crystals to the dissemination of science to the public. After completing her Post-Doctoral research, she moved to Trento (Italy) to be a Research Associate with the then Museo Tridentino di Scienze Naturali, now MUSE under the direction of Michele Lanzinger. In 2000, she curated the geological and cultural aspects of the exhibit "the Deluge, which had over 100,000 visitors the number of visitors and marked the transition from a local Natural History museum to MUSE. Subsequently, she taught Past Climate Change to archaeologists and palaeo anthropologists within the Faculty of Fine Arts of the University of Trento. In 2007, she became a Lecturer at the University of Newcastle, Australia, and progressed to Full Professor.

Her impact in speleothem science has been to establish criteria that enabled speleothem petrography and microstratigraphy to become a tool to extract climate information and check the significance of chemical data. She was the first to recognise volcanic eruptions recorded in stalagmites and sub-glacial crusts. Since 1990 she has been disseminating the importance of past-climate science at summer schools, congresses, conferences, and in talks reaching rural communities, schools, cavers associations and tourist operators. She has also written for The Conversation about climate change and has provided expert commentary to media.

Frisia has always believed that science has to be narrated to the general public in a positive way, not sensational, but as it is.

== Writing ==
Frisia has authored and co-authored works on the role of carbonate crystallochemistry in recording past climate and environments applied to broader topics. These include: speleothem fabrics, and microstratigraphy as palaeo-climate tools; primary dolomite formation; identifying volcanic eruptions in stalagmites and in Antarctic subglacial carbonate crusts. Her work recognising the properties of stalagmites as archives of solar activity, and anthropogenic industrial emissions, advance speleothem-based palaeoclimate science by combining cave monitoring, crystallization pathways and ultra-high-resolution trace element geochemistry.
