= Bette Otto-Bliesner =

American earth climate researcher

Bette L. Otto-Bliesner
- Born: Bette Lou Otto; 1950 (age 75–76); Chicago, Illinois
- Education: University of Wisconsin-Madison
- Scientific career
- Workplaces: National Center for Atmospheric Research
- Thesis: The dynamics of seasonal change of the long waves as deduced from a low-order general cirulation model (1980)

Bette Otto-Bliesner is an earth scientist known for her modeling of Earth's past climate and its changes over different geological eras.

== Education and career ==
Otto-Bliesner graduated from William Fremd High School in Palatine, Illinois in 1968. She has a B.S. in meteorology from the University of Madison-Wisconsin (1972). In 1974, she earned her M.S. from University of Wisconsin - Madison with a thesis titled "Isentropically time-averaged mass circulations in the Northern Hemisphere". She earned her Ph.D. from the University of Wisconsin-Madison in 1980, and was an associate scientist there from 1980 to 1986. After two years as a contract scientist at ARC Technologies, Otto-Bliesner joined the Department of Geology at the University of Texas at Arlington where she worked from 1990 to 1996. She joined the National Center for Atmospheric Research (NCAR) in 1997 where she was promoted to senior scientist in 2007.

Otto-Bliesner has worked on multiple chapters in the Assessment Review reports from the Intergovernmental Panel on Climate Change, an organization which was awarded the 2007 Nobel Peace Prize for its long series of such reports. She was one of the 16 lead authors on the 2007 chapter on "Paleoclimate". She was one of the 17 lead authors on the 2013 chapter on "Information from the Paleoclimate Archives".

== Research ==
Otto-Bliesner's research connects paleogeographic information with global climate models. Through this approach, she has examined interactions between continental weathering and atmospheric carbon dioxide levels in the period from 570 to 425 million years ago, revealed that deciduous forests help regulate temperatures in the Cretaceous period, and identified factors leading to the persistence of snow on continental ice sheets. Her modeling work has also assessed temporal variability in El Niño/La Niña cycles and regional summer monsoons. Through models jointly considering atmospheric conditions and the ocean, Otto-Bliesner's research has linked deep ocean circulation and global climate in the late Cretaceous (80 million years ago) and the Last Glacial Maximum. This research focus has revealed that changes in the Atlantic Meridional Overturning Circulation are linked freshwater input into the ocean and the Bølling-Allerød warming at the end of the last glacial period. Through a combination of direct sampling and modeling, her research has detailed the forcing that led to the Little Ice Age. In polar regions, Otto-Bliesner has modeled variability in Arctic temperatures which result in the retreat or collapse of polar ice sheets followed by increases in sea level.

Otto-Bliesner also works on developing the methods used to establish climate models and through this has enabled low-resolution depictions of atmospheric conditions that can be coupled with high-resolution circulation models. Through collaborative analysis of the effectiveness of climate models, Otto-Bliesner has examined the connections between greenhouse gasses and global warming, she has weighed the impact of the sun, volcanic ash, and greenhouse gasses on temperatures on Earth and she participated in projects that evaluate climate models through comparisons with paleoclimate data. Most recently, she helped establish the framework of the Community Earth System Model that links model forcing parameters with data from the last thousand years.

In 2020, Jiang Zhu, Christopher Poulsen, and Otto-Bliesner published an analysis of the Coupled Model Intercomparison Project phase 6 (CMIP6) which revealed that the model is overly sensitive to atmospheric carbon dioxide levels and produces higher surface temperatures than would be predicted when the model is validated using historical data. The next IPCC assessment report will use CMIP6 in its predictions of future climate change, Otto-Bliesner noted "Figuring out whether the high climate sensitivity in CMIP6 models is realistic is of tremendous importance for us to anticipate future warming and to make adaptation plans".

=== Selected publications ===
- Otto-Bliesner, B. L. (2006-03-24). "Simulating Arctic Climate Warmth and Icefield Retreat in the Last Interglaciation". Science. 311 (5768): 1751–1753. Bibcode:2006Sci...311.1751O. doi:10.1126/science.1120808. ISSN 0036-8075. PMID 16556838. S2CID 35153489.
- Otto-Bliesner, Bette L.; Brady, Esther C.; Clauzet, Gabriel; Tomas, Robert; Levis, Samuel; Kothavala, Zav (2006-06-01). "Last Glacial Maximum and Holocene Climate in CCSM3". Journal of Climate. 19 (11): 2526–2544. Bibcode:2006JCli...19.2526O. doi:10.1175/JCLI3748.1. ISSN 1520-0442.
- Otto-Bliesner, B. L.; Hewitt, C. D.; Marchitto, T. M.; Brady, E.; Abe-Ouchi, A.; Crucifix, M.; Murakami, S.; Weber, S. L. (2007). "Last Glacial Maximum ocean thermohaline circulation: PMIP2 model intercomparisons and data constraints". Geophysical Research Letters. 34 (12). Bibcode:2007GeoRL..3412706O. doi:10.1029/2007GL029475. ISSN 1944-8007.
- Braconnot, P.; Otto-Bliesner, B.; Harrison, S.; Joussaume, S.; Peterchmitt, J.-Y.; Abe-Ouchi, A.; Crucifix, M.; Driesschaert, E.; Fichefet, Th.; Hewitt, C. D.; Kageyama, M. (2007-06-04). "Results of PMIP2 coupled simulations of the Mid-Holocene and Last Glacial Maximum – Part 1: experiments and large-scale features". Climate of the Past. 3 (2): 261–277. Bibcode:2007CliPa...3..261B. doi:10.5194/cp-3-261-2007. hdl:2078.1/37548. ISSN 1814-9332. S2CID 17817309.
- Otto-Bliesner, Bette L.; Brady, Esther C.; Fasullo, John; Jahn, Alexandra; Landrum, Laura; Stevenson, Samantha; Rosenbloom, Nan; Mai, Andrew; Strand, Gary (2016-05-01). "Climate Variability and Change since 850 CE: An Ensemble Approach with the Community Earth System Model". Bulletin of the American Meteorological Society. 97 (5): 735–754. Bibcode:2016BAMS...97..735O. doi:10.1175/BAMS-D-14-00233.1. ISSN 0003-0007.

== Awards and honors ==
- One of the 16 lead authors for one chapter of the 2007 IPCC Assessment Report, and one of the 17 lead authors for a chapter in the 2013 report. This series of Reports received the Nobel Peace Prize (2007)
- Fellow, American Geophysical Union (2015)
- Fellow, American Meteorological Society (2016)
- Emiliani Lecture, American Geophysical Union (2016)
- AMS Syukuro Manabe Climate Research Award (2026)
