= Simon Tett =

British climatologist

Simon Tett is a climatologist at the University of Edinburgh who was formerly with the Hadley Centre.

His most-cited paper is Mitchell, J.F.B.; Johns, T.C.; Gregory, J.M.; Tett, S.F.B. (10 August 1995). "Climate response to increasing levels of greenhouse gases and sulphate aerosols". Nature. 376 (6540): 501–4. doi:10.1038/376501a0. S2CID 4328502. Of it he says:

All attempts at detecting and attributing climate change signals need a reliable observed data set and simulations with mechanisms that drive climate change included. In a nutshell, this paper is important because it was the first study to investigate the effect of sulphate aerosols in a general circulation model of the climate system. The experiments simulate the climate back to 1860 (which is when the global records of surface temperature became reliable)... After 1970 our model with greenhouse gases alone begins to depart significantly from the observations. However, when we included sulphate aerosols, which have a cooling effect, the model agreed with the data from the 1930s and onwards. The rapid warming that has taken place since 1970 is, according to the model, attributable to a heating effect from greenhouse gases and a cooling effect from sulphate aerosols.
