= IPCC First Assessment Report =

1990 IPCC report

The First Assessment Report (FAR) of the Intergovernmental Panel on Climate Change (IPCC) was completed in 1990. It served as the basis of the United Nations Framework Convention on Climate Change (UNFCCC). This report had effects not only on the establishment of the UNFCCC, but also on the first session of the Conference of the Parties (COP), held in Berlin in 1995. The executive summary of the WG I Summary for Policymakers report that said they were certain that emissions resulting from human activities are substantially increasing the atmospheric concentrations of the greenhouse gases, resulting on average in an additional warming of the Earth's surface. They calculated with confidence that CO_{2} had been responsible for over half the enhanced greenhouse effect.

They predicted that under a "business as usual" (BAU) scenario, global mean temperature would increase by about 0.3 °C per decade during the [21st] century. They judged that global mean surface air temperature had increased by 0.3 to 0.6 °C over the last 100 years, broadly consistent with prediction of climate models, but also of the same magnitude as natural climate variability. The unequivocal detection of the enhanced greenhouse effect was not likely for a decade or more.

The 1992 supplementary report was an update, requested in the context of the negotiations on the UNFCCC at the Earth Summit (United Nations Conference on Environment and Development) in Rio de Janeiro in 1992. The major conclusion was that research since 1990 did "not affect our fundamental understanding of the science of the greenhouse effect and either confirm or do not justify alteration of the major conclusions of the first IPCC scientific assessment". It noted that transient (time-dependent) simulations, which had been very preliminary in the FAR, were now improved, but did not include aerosol or ozone changes.

== Overview ==
The report was issued in three main sections, corresponding to the three Working Groups of scientists that the IPCC had established.

- Working Group I: Scientific Assessment of Climate Change, edited by J.T. Houghton, G.J. Jenkins and J.J. Ephraums
- Working Group II: Impacts Assessment of Climate Change, edited by W.J. McG. Tegart, G.W. Sheldon and D.C. Griffiths
- Working Group III:The IPCC Response Strategies

Each section included a summary for policymakers. This format was followed in subsequent Assessment Reports.

The executive summary of the policymakers' summary of the WG I report includes:

- We are certain of the following: there is a natural greenhouse effect...; emissions resulting from human activities are substantially increasing the atmospheric concentrations of the greenhouse gases: CO_{2}, methane, CFCs and nitrous oxide. These increases will enhance the greenhouse effect, resulting on average in an additional warming of the Earth's surface. The main greenhouse gas, water vapour, will increase in response to global warming and further enhance it.
- We calculate with confidence that: ...CO_{2} has been responsible for over half the enhanced greenhouse effect; long-lived gases would require immediate reductions in emissions from human activities of over 60% to stabilise their concentrations at today's levels...
- Based on current models, we predict: under [BAU] increase of global mean temperature during the [21st] century of about 0.3 °C per decade (with an uncertainty range of 0.2 to 0.5 °C per decade); this is greater than that seen over the past 10,000 years; under other ... scenarios which assume progressively increasing levels of controls, rates of increase in global mean temperature of about 0.2 °C [to] about 0.1 °C per decade.
- There are many uncertainties in our predictions particularly with regard to the timing, magnitude and regional patterns of climate change, due to our incomplete understanding of: sources and sinks of GHGs; clouds; oceans; polar ice sheets.
- Our judgement is that: global mean surface air temperature has increased by 0.3 to 0.6 °C over the last 100 years...; The size of this warming is broadly consistent with predictions of climate models, but it is also of the same magnitude as natural climate variability. Thus the observed increase could be largely due to this natural variability; alternatively this variability and other human factors could have offset a still larger human-induced greenhouse warming. The unequivocal detection of the enhanced greenhouse effect is not likely for a decade or more.
- under the IPCC business as usual emissions scenario, an average rate of global mean sea level rise of about 6 cm per decade over the next century (with an uncertainty range of 3 – 10 cm per decade), mainly due to thermal expansion of the oceans and the melting of some land ice. The predicted rise is about 20 cm ... by 2030, and 65 cm by the end of the next century.

== Controversies ==
When discussing the politicisation of IPCC assessment reports climatologist Kevin E. Trenberth stated:

The SPM [Summary for policymakers] was approved line by line by governments ... The argument here is that the scientists determine what can be said, but the governments determine how it can best be said. Negotiations occur over wording to ensure accuracy, balance, clarity of message, and relevance to understanding and policy. The IPCC process is dependent on the good will of the participants in producing a balanced assessment. However, in Shanghai, it appeared that there were attempts to blunt, and perhaps obfuscate, the messages in the report, most notably by Saudi Arabia. This led to very protracted debates over wording on even bland and what should be uncontroversial text ... The most contentious paragraph in the IPCC (2001) SPM was the concluding one on attribution. After much debate, the following was carefully crafted: "In the light of new evidence, and taking into account the remaining uncertainties, most of the observed warming over the last 50 years is likely to have been due to the increase in greenhouse-gas concentrations."

== See also ==
- Avoiding dangerous climate change
- Business action on climate change
- Energy conservation
- Energy policy
- Global climate model
- Individual and political action on climate change
- Precautionary principle
- World energy resources and consumption
