= Climatic Research Unit email controversy =

2009 controversy

- Date: 17 November 2009
- Location: Climatic Research Unit, University of East Anglia
- Also known as: "Climategate"
- Inquiries: House of Commons Science and Technology Committee (UK); Independent Climate Change Email Review (UK); International Science Assessment Panel (UK); Pennsylvania State University (US); United States Environmental Protection Agency (US); Department of Commerce (US)
- Verdict: Exoneration or withdrawal of all major or serious charges

The Climatic Research Unit email controversy (also known as "Climategate") began in November 2009 with the hacking of a server at the Climatic Research Unit (CRU) at the University of East Anglia (UEA) by an external attacker, copying thousands of emails and computer files (the Climatic Research Unit documents) to various internet locations several weeks before the Copenhagen Summit on climate change.

The story was first broken by climate change denialists, who argued that the emails showed that global warming was a scientific conspiracy and that scientists manipulated climate data and attempted to suppress critics. The CRU rejected this, saying that the emails had been taken out of context. FactCheck.org reported that climate change deniers misrepresented the contents of the emails. Columnist James Delingpole popularised the term "Climategate" to describe the controversy.

The mainstream media picked up the story, as negotiations over climate change mitigation began in Copenhagen on 7 December 2009. Because of the timing, scientists, policy makers and public relations experts said that the release of emails was a smear campaign intended to undermine the climate conference. In response to the controversy, the American Association for the Advancement of Science (AAAS), the American Meteorological Society (AMS) and the Union of Concerned Scientists (UCS) released statements supporting the scientific consensus that the Earth's mean surface temperature had been rising for decades, with the AAAS concluding: "based on multiple lines of scientific evidence that global climate change caused by human activities is now underway... it is a growing threat to society".

Eight committees investigated the allegations and published reports, finding no evidence of fraud or scientific misconduct. The scientific consensus that global warming is occurring as a result of human activity remained unchanged throughout the investigations.

== Timeline of the initial incident ==
The incident began when a server used by the Climatic Research Unit was breached in "a sophisticated and carefully orchestrated attack", and 160 MB of data were obtained including more than 1,000 emails and 3,000 other documents. The University of East Anglia stated that the server from which the data were taken was not one that could be accessed easily, and that the data could not have been released inadvertently. Norfolk Police later added that the offenders used methods that are common in unlawful internet activity, designed to obstruct later enquiries. The breach was first discovered on 17 November 2009 after the server of the RealClimate website was also hacked and a copy of the stolen data was uploaded there. RealClimate's Gavin Schmidt said that he had information that the files had been obtained through "a hack into [CRU's] backup mail server". At about the same time, a short comment appeared on climate sceptic Stephen McIntyre's Climate Audit website saying that "A miracle has happened."

On 19 November, an archive file containing the data was copied to numerous locations across the Internet. An anonymous post from a Saudi Arabian IP address to the climate-sceptic blog The Air Vent described the material as "a random selection of correspondence, code, and documents", adding that climate science is "too important to be kept under wraps". That same day, McIntyre was forwarded an internal email sent to UEA staff warning that "climate change sceptics" had obtained a "large volume of files and emails". Charles Rotter, moderator of the climate-sceptic blog Watts Up With That, which had been the first to get a link and download the files, gave a copy to his flatmate Steve Mosher. Mosher received a posting from the hacker complaining that nothing was happening and replied: "A lot is happening behind the scenes. It is not being ignored. Much is being coordinated among major players and the media. Thank you very much. You will notice the beginnings of activity on other sites now. Here soon to follow." Shortly afterwards, the emails began to be widely publicised on climate-sceptics blogs. On 20 November, the story emerged in mainstream media.

Norfolk police subsequently confirmed that they were "investigating criminal offences in relation to a data breach at the University of East Anglia" with the assistance of the Metropolitan Police Central e-Crime unit, the Information Commissioner's Office (ICO), and the National Domestic Extremism Team (NDET). Commenting on the involvement of the NDET, a spokesman said: "At present we have two police officers assisting Norfolk with their investigation, and we have also provided computer forensic expertise. While this is not strictly a domestic extremism matter, as a national police unit we had the expertise and resource to assist with this investigation, as well as good background knowledge of climate change issues in relation to criminal investigations." However, the police cautioned that "major investigations of this nature are of necessity very detailed and as a consequence can take time to reach a conclusion". On 18 July 2012, the Norfolk police finally decided to close its investigation because they did not have a "realistic prospect of identifying the offender or offenders and launching criminal proceedings within the time constraints imposed by law". They also said that the attack had been carried out "remotely via the internet", and that there was "no evidence to suggest that anyone working at or associated with the University of East Anglia was involved in the crime".

== Content of the documents ==
The material comprised more than 1,000 emails, 2,000 documents, as well as commented source code pertaining to climate-change research, covering the period from 1996 to 2009. According to an analysis in The Guardian, the vast majority of the emails were from or to four climatologists: Phil Jones, the head of the CRU; Keith Briffa, a CRU climatologist specialising in tree ring analysis; Tim Osborn, a climate modeller at CRU; and Mike Hulme, director of the Tyndall Centre for Climate Change Research. The four were either recipients or originators of all but 66 of the 1,073 emails, with most of the remainder of the emails being sent from mailing lists. A few other emails were sent by, or to, other staff at the CRU. Jones, Briffa, Osborn and Hulme had written high-profile scientific papers on climate change that had been cited in reports by the Intergovernmental Panel on Climate Change.

Most of the emails concerned technical and mundane aspects of climate research, such as data analysis and details of scientific conferences. The Guardian's analysis of the emails suggests that the hacker had filtered them. Four scientists were targeted and a concordance plot shows that the words "data", "climate", "paper", "research", "temperature" and "model" were predominant. The controversy has focused on a small number of emails with climate change denier websites picking out particular phrases, such as one in which Kevin Trenberth said, "The fact is that we can't account for the lack of warming at the moment and it is a travesty that we can't". This was actually part of a discussion on the need for better monitoring of the energy flows involved in short-term climate variability, but was grossly mischaracterised by critics.

The most quoted email was one in which Phil Jones said that he had used "Mike's Nature trick" when preparing a graph as a 1999 cover illustration for the World Meteorological Organization "to hide the decline" in reconstructions based on tree-ring proxy data post-1960, when measured temperatures were actually rising. The "trick" was a technique to combine instrumental temperature record data with long term reconstructions, and "the decline" referred to the tree-ring divergence problem, which had already been openly discussed in scientific papers, but these two phrases were taken out of context by commentators promoting climate change denial, including US Senator Jim Inhofe and former Governor of Alaska Sarah Palin, as though the phrases referred to some decline in measured global temperatures, even though they came from an email written at a time when temperatures were at a record high.

John Tierney, writing in The New York Times in November 2009, said that the claims by sceptics of "hoax" or "fraud" were incorrect, but that the graph on the cover of a report for policy makers and journalists did not show these non-experts where proxy measurements changed to measured temperatures. The final analyses from various subsequent inquiries concluded that in this context "trick" was normal scientific or mathematical jargon for a neat way of handling data, in this case a statistical method used to bring two or more different kinds of data sets together in a legitimate fashion. The EPA notes that in fact, the evidence shows that the research community was fully aware of these issues and that no one was hiding or concealing them.

An Associated Press review of the emails concluded that they showed scientists fending off critics, stating that "One of the most disturbing elements suggests an effort to avoid sharing scientific data with critics skeptical of global warming", and mentioned ethical problems with this action due to the fact that "free access to data is important so others can repeat experiments as part of the scientific method". They cited a science policy expert as stating that it was "normal science politics, but on the extreme end, though still within bounds".

== Responses ==
In the United States, former Republican House Science Committee chairman Sherwood Boehlert called the attacks a "manufactured distraction", and Newsweek and The New York Times described the dispute as a "highly orchestrated" and manufactured controversy. Concerns about the media's role in promoting early allegations while also minimising later coverage exonerating the scientists were raised by journalists and policy experts. Historian Spencer R. Weart of the American Institute of Physics said the incident was unprecedented in the history of science, having "never before seen a set of people accuse an entire community of scientists of deliberate deception and other professional malfeasance". The United States National Academy of Sciences expressed concern and condemned what they called "political assaults on scientists and climate scientists in particular".

In the United Kingdom and United States, there were calls for official inquiries into issues raised by the documents. The British Conservative politician Nigel Lawson said: "The integrity of the scientific evidence ... has been called into question. And the reputation of British science has been seriously tarnished. A high-level independent inquiry must be set up without delay." Bob Ward of the Grantham Research Institute on Climate Change and the Environment at the London School of Economics said that there had to be a rigorous investigation into the substance of the email messages, once appropriate action has been taken over the hacking, to clear the impression of impropriety given by the selective disclosure and dissemination of the messages. United States Senator Jim Inhofe, who had previously stated that global warming was "the greatest hoax ever perpetrated on the American people", also planned to demand an inquiry. In a debate in the United States House of Representatives on 2 December 2009, Republicans read out extracts from eight of the emails, and Representative Jim Sensenbrenner said: "These e-mails show a pattern of suppression, manipulation and secrecy that was inspired by ideology, condescension and profit". In response, the president's science adviser John Holdren said that the science was proper, and the emails only concerned a fraction of the research. Government scientist Jane Lubchenco said that the emails "do nothing to undermine the very strong scientific consensus" that the Earth is warming due to human actions.

Climate change sceptics gained wide publicity in blogs and news media, making allegations that the hacked emails showed evidence that climate scientists manipulated data. A few other commentators such as Roger A. Pielke said that the evidence supported claims that dissenting scientific papers had been suppressed. The Wall Street Journal reported that the emails revealed apparent efforts to ensure that the IPCC included their own views and excluded others, and that the scientists withheld scientific data.

An editorial in Nature stated that "A fair reading of the e-mails reveals nothing to support the denialists' conspiracy theories." It said that emails showed harassment of researchers, with multiple Freedom of Information requests to the Climatic Research Unit, but release of information had been hampered by national government restrictions on releasing the meteorological data researchers had been using. Nature considered that emails had not shown anything that undermined the scientific case on human-caused global warming or raised any substantive reasons for concern about the researchers' own papers. The Telegraph reported that academics and climate change researchers dismissed the allegations, saying that nothing in the emails proved wrongdoing. Independent reviews by FactCheck and the Associated Press said that the emails did not affect evidence that man-made global warming is a real threat, and said that emails were being misrepresented to support unfounded claims of scientific misconduct. The AP said that the "[e]-mails stolen from climate scientists show they stonewalled sceptics and discussed hiding data". In this context, John Tierney of The New York Times wrote: "these researchers, some of the most prominent climate experts in Britain and America, seem so focused on winning the public-relations war that they exaggerate their certitude – and ultimately undermine their own cause".

Climate scientists at the CRU and elsewhere received numerous threatening and abusive emails in the wake of the initial incidents. Norfolk Police interviewed Phil Jones about death threats made against him following the release of the emails; Jones later said that the police told him that these "didn't fulfil the criteria for death threats". Death threats against two scientists also are under investigation by the US Federal Bureau of Investigation. Climate scientists in Australia have reported receiving threatening emails including references to where they live and warnings to "be careful" about how some people might react to their scientific findings. In July 2012, Michael Mann said that the episode had caused him to "endure countless verbal attacks upon my professional reputation, my honesty, my integrity, even my life and liberty".

=== University of East Anglia ===
The University of East Anglia was notified of the security breach on 17 November 2009, but when the story was published in the press on 20 November, they had no statement ready. On 24 November, Trevor Davies, the University of East Anglia pro-vice-chancellor with responsibility for research, rejected calls for Jones' resignation or firing: "We see no reason for Professor Jones to resign and, indeed, we would not accept his resignation. He is a valued and important scientist." The university announced that it would conduct an independent review into issues including Freedom of Information requests to the Climatic Research Unit: it would "address the issue of data security, an assessment of how we responded to a deluge of Freedom of Information requests, and any other relevant issues which the independent reviewer advises should be addressed".

The university announced on 1 December that Phil Jones was to stand aside as director of the Unit until the completion of the review. Two days later, the university announced that Sir Muir Russell would chair the inquiry, which would be known as the Independent Climate Change Email Review, and would "examine email exchanges to determine whether there is evidence of suppression or manipulation of data". The review would also scrutinise the CRU's policies and practices for "acquiring, assembling, subjecting to peer review, and disseminating data and research findings" and "their compliance or otherwise with best scientific practice". In addition, the investigation would review CRU's compliance with Freedom of Information Act requests and also "make recommendations about the management, governance and security structures for CRU and the security, integrity and release of the data it holds". The Independent Climate Change Email Review report was published on 7 July 2010.

On 22 March 2010 the university announced the composition of an independent Science Assessment Panel to reassess key CRU papers that have already been peer-reviewed and published in journals. The panel did not seek to evaluate the science itself, but rather whether "the conclusions [reached by the CRU] represented an honest and scientifically justified interpretation of the data". The university consulted with the Royal Society in establishing the panel. It was chaired by Lord Oxburgh, and its membership consisted of Huw Davies of ETH Zurich, Kerry Emanual of Massachusetts Institute of Technology, Lisa Graumlich of the University of Arizona, David Hand of Imperial College London, and Herbert Huppert and Michael Kelly of the University of Cambridge. It started its work in March 2010 and released its report on 14 April 2010. During its inquiry, the panel examined eleven representative CRU publications, selected with advice from the Royal Society, that spanned a period of over 20 years, as well as other CRU research materials. It also spent fifteen person-days at the UEA carrying out interviews with scientists.

=== Climatologists ===
Among the scientists whose emails were disclosed, the CRU's researchers said in a statement that the emails had been taken out of context and merely reflected an honest exchange of ideas. Michael Mann, director of Pennsylvania State University's Earth System Science Center, said that sceptics were "taking these words totally out of context to make something trivial appear nefarious" and called the entire incident a careful, "high-level, orchestrated smear campaign to distract the public about the nature of the climate change problem". Kevin E. Trenberth of the National Center for Atmospheric Research said that he was appalled at the release of the emails but thought that it might backfire against climate sceptics, as the messages would show "the integrity of scientists". He also said that climate change sceptics had selectively quoted words and phrases out of context and that the timing suggested an attempt to undermine talks at the December 2009 Copenhagen global climate summit. Tom Wigley, a former director of the CRU and now head of the US National Center for Atmospheric Research, condemned the threats that he and other colleagues had received as "truly stomach-turning", and commented: "None of it affects the science one iota. Accusations of data distortion or faking are baseless. I can rebut and explain all of the apparently incriminating e-mails that I have looked at, but it is going to be very time consuming to do so." In relation to the harassment that he and his colleagues were experiencing, he said: "This sort of thing has been going on at a much lower level for almost 20 years and there have been other outbursts of this sort of behaviour – criticism and abusive emails and things like that in the past. So this is a worse manifestation but it's happened before so it's not that surprising."

Other prominent climate scientists, such as Richard Somerville, called the incident a smear campaign. David Reay of the University of Edinburgh said that the CRU "is just one of many climate-research institutes that provide the underlying scientific basis for climate policy at national and international levels. The conspiracy theorists may be having a field day, but if they really knew academia they would also know that every published paper and data set is continually put through the wringer by other independent research groups. The information that makes it into the IPCC reports is some of the most rigorously tested and debated in any area of science." Stephen Schneider compared the political attacks on climate scientists to the witch-hunts of McCarthyism.

James Hansen said that the controversy has "no effect on the science" and that while some of the emails reflect poor judgment, the evidence for human-made climate change is overwhelming.

One of the IPCC's lead authors, Raymond Pierrehumbert of the University of Chicago, expressed concern at the precedent established by this incident: "[T]his is a criminal act of vandalism and of harassment of a group of scientists that are only going about their business doing science. It represents a whole new escalation in the war on climate scientists who are only trying to get at the truth... What next? Deliberate monkeying with data on servers? Insertion of bugs into climate models?" Another IPCC lead author, David Karoly of the University of Melbourne, reported receiving hate emails in the wake of the incident and said that he believed that there was "an organised campaign to discredit individual climate scientists". Andrew Pitman of the University of New South Wales commented: "The major problem is that scientists have to be able to communicate their science without fear or favour and there seems to be a well-orchestrated campaign designed to intimidate some scientists."

In response to the incident, 1,700 British scientists signed a joint statement circulated by the UK Met Office declaring their "utmost confidence in the observational evidence for global warming and the scientific basis for concluding that it is due primarily to human activities".

Patrick J. Michaels, who was criticised in the emails and who has long faulted evidence pointing to human-driven warming, said: "This is not a smoking gun; this is a mushroom cloud". He said that some emails showed an effort to block the release of data for independent review and that some messages discussed discrediting him by stating that he knew his research was wrong in his doctoral dissertation, "This shows these are people willing to bend rules and go after other people's reputations in very serious ways."

Judith Curry wrote that, in her opinion, "there are two broader issues raised by these emails that are impeding the public credibility of climate research: lack of transparency in climate data, and 'tribalism' in some segments of the climate research community that is impeding peer review and the assessment process". She hoped that the affair would change the approach of scientists to providing their data to the public and their response to criticisms of their work. She had herself learned to be careful about what to put in emails when a "disgruntled employee" made a freedom of information request. Mann described these comments as "somewhat naive" considering that in recent years scientists had become much more open with their data. He said that sceptics "will always complain about something else, want something more. Eventually, as we see, they've found a way to get access to private communications between scientists."

Hans von Storch, who also concurs with the mainstream view on global warming, said that the University of East Anglia (UEA) had "violated a fundamental principle of science" by refusing to share data with other researchers. "They play science as a power game," he said. On 24 November 2009 the university had stated that 95% of the raw station data was accessible via the Global Historical Climatology Network, and had been for several years. They were already working with the Met Office to obtain permissions to release the remaining raw data.

=== Scientific organisations ===
The Intergovernmental Panel on Climate Change Working Group I issued statements that the assessment process, involving hundreds of scientists worldwide, is designed to be transparent and to prevent any individual or small group from manipulating the process. The statement said that the "internal consistency from multiple lines of evidence strongly supports the work of the scientific community, including those individuals singled out in these email exchanges".

The American Meteorological Society stated that the incident did not affect the society's position on climate change. They pointed to the breadth of evidence for human influence on climate, stating:

For climate change research, the body of research in the literature is very large and the dependence on any one set of research results to the comprehensive understanding of the climate system is very, very small. Even if some of the charges of improper behavior in this particular case turn out to be true—which is not yet clearly the case—the impact on the science of climate change would be very limited.

The American Geophysical Union issued a statement that they found "it offensive that these emails were obtained by illegal cyber attacks and they are being exploited to distort the scientific debate about the urgent issue of climate change". They reaffirmed their 2007 position statement on climate change "based on the large body of scientific evidence that Earth's climate is warming and that human activity is a contributing factor. Nothing in the University of East Anglia hacked e-mails represents a significant challenge to that body of scientific evidence."

The American Association for the Advancement of Science (AAAS) reaffirmed its position on global warming and "expressed grave concerns that the illegal release of private emails stolen from the University of East Anglia should not cause policy-makers and the public to become confused about the scientific basis of global climate change. Scientific integrity demands robust, independent peer review, however, and AAAS therefore emphasised that investigations are appropriate whenever significant questions are raised regarding the transparency and rigour of the scientific method, the peer-review process, or the responsibility of individual scientists. The responsible institutions are mounting such investigations." Alan I. Leshner, CEO of the AAAS and executive publisher of the journal Science, said: "AAAS takes issues of scientific integrity very seriously. It is fair and appropriate to pursue answers to any allegations of impropriety. It's important to remember, though, that the reality of climate change is based on a century of robust and well-validated science."

=== UK Met Office ===
On 23 November 2009, a spokesman for the Met Office, the UK's national weather service, which works with the CRU in providing global temperature information, said that there was no need for an inquiry. "The bottom line is that temperatures continue to rise and humans are responsible for it. We have every confidence in the science and the various datasets we use. The peer-review process is as robust as it could possibly be."

On 5 December 2009, however, the Met Office indicated its intention to re-examine 160 years of temperature data in the light of concerns that public confidence in the science had been damaged by the controversy over the emails. The Met Office would also publish online the temperature records for over 1,000 worldwide weather stations. It remained confident that its analysis would be shown to be correct and that the data would show a temperature rise over the past 150 years.

=== Other responses ===
Rajendra Pachauri, as chairman of the Intergovernmental Panel on Climate Change, told the BBC in December 2009 that he considered the affair to be "a serious issue" and that they "will look into it in detail". He later clarified that the IPCC would review the incident to identify lessons to be learned and rejected suggestions that the IPCC itself should carry out an investigation.

In a series of emails sent through a National Academy of Sciences (NAS) listserv, apparently forwarded outside the group by an unknown person, scientists discussing the "Climategate" fallout considered launching advertising campaigns, widening their public presence, pushing the NAS to take a more active role in explaining climate science and creating a nonprofit to serve as a voice for the scientific community.

A paper by Reiner Grundmann used a limited account of the events to discuss norms of scientific practice in relation to two science ethics approaches, the Mertonian norms as of Robert K. Merton, and Roger Pielke Jr.'s concept of honest brokering in science policy interactions. Sources for the paper were chosen for accessibility, emphasising "critical accounts".

== Inquiries and reports ==
Eight committees investigated the allegations and published reports, finding no evidence of fraud or scientific misconduct. The scientific consensus that global warming is occurring as a result of human activity remained unchanged by the end of the investigations. However, the reports urged the scientists to avoid any such allegations in the future, and to regain public confidence following this media storm, with "more efforts than ever to make available all their supporting data – right down to the computer codes they use – to allow their findings to be properly verified". Climate scientists and organisations pledged to improve scientific research and collaboration with other researchers by improving data management and opening up access to data, and to honour any freedom of information requests that relate to climate science.

=== House of Commons Science and Technology Committee ===
On 22 January 2010, the House of Commons Science and Technology Select Committee announced it would conduct an inquiry into the affair, examining the implications of the disclosure for the integrity of scientific research, reviewing the scope of the independent Muir Russell review announced by the UEA, and reviewing the independence of international climate data sets. The committee invited written submissions from interested parties, and published 55 submissions that it had received by 10 February. They included submissions from the University of East Anglia, the Global Warming Policy Foundation, the Institute of Physics, the Royal Society of Chemistry, the Met Office, several other professional bodies, prominent scientists, some climate change sceptics, several MEPs and other interested parties. An oral evidence session was held on 1 March 2010.

The Science and Technology Select Committee inquiry reported on 31 March 2010 that it had found that "the scientific reputation of Professor Jones and CRU remains intact". The emails and claims raised in the controversy did not challenge the scientific consensus that "global warming is happening and that it is induced by human activity". The MPs had seen no evidence to support claims that Jones had tampered with data or interfered with the peer-review process.

The committee criticised a "culture of non-disclosure at CRU" and a general lack of transparency in climate science where scientific papers had usually not included all the data and code used in reconstructions. It said that "even if the data that CRU used were not publicly available—which they mostly are—or the methods not published—which they have been—its published results would still be credible: the results from CRU agree with those drawn from other international data sets; in other words, the analyses have been repeated and the conclusions have been verified." The report added that "scientists could have saved themselves a lot of trouble by aggressively publishing all their data instead of worrying about how to stonewall their critics." The committee criticised the university for the way that freedom of information requests were handled, and for failing to give adequate support to the scientists to deal with such requests.

The committee chairman Phil Willis said that the "standard practice" in climate science generally of not routinely releasing all raw data and computer codes "needs to change and it needs to change quickly". Jones had admitted sending "awful emails"; Willis commented that "[Jones] probably wishes that emails were never invented," but "apart from that we do believe that Prof. Jones has in many ways been scapegoated as a result of what really was a frustration on his part that people were asking for information purely to undermine his research." In Willis' view this did not excuse any failure to deal properly with FOI Act requests, but the committee accepted that Jones had released all the data that he could. It stated: "There is no reason why Professor Jones should not resume his post. He was certainly not co-operative with those seeking to get data, but that was true of all the climate scientists".

The committee was careful to point out that its report had been written after a single day of oral testimony and would not be as in-depth as other inquiries.

=== Science Assessment Panel ===
The report of the independent Science Assessment Panel was published on 14 April 2010 and concluded that the panel had seen "no evidence of any deliberate scientific malpractice in any of the work of the Climatic Research Unit." It found that the CRU's work had been "carried out with integrity" and had used "fair and satisfactory" methods. The CRU was found to be "objective and dispassionate in their view of the data and their results, and there was no hint of tailoring results to a particular agenda." Instead, "their sole aim was to establish as robust a record of temperatures in recent centuries as possible."

The panel commented that it was "very surprising that research in an area that depends so heavily on statistical methods has not been carried out in close collaboration with professional statisticians." It found that although the CRU had not made inappropriate use of statistical methods, some of the methods used may not have been the best for the purpose, though it said that "it is not clear, however, that better methods would have produced significantly different results." It suggested that the CRU could have done more to document and archive its work, data and algorithms and stated that the scientists were "ill prepared" for the amount of public attention generated by their work, commenting that "as with many small research groups their internal procedures were rather informal." The media and other scientific organisations were criticised for having "sometimes neglected" to reflect the uncertainties, doubts and assumptions of the work done by the CRU. The UK Government's policy of charging for access to scientific data was described as "inconsistent with policies of open access to data promoted elsewhere." The panel was also stated that "Although we deplore the tone of much of the criticism that has been directed at CRU, we believe that this questioning of the methods and data used in dendroclimatology will ultimately have a beneficial effect and improve working practices." It found that some of the criticism had been "selective and uncharitable" and critics had displayed "a lack of awareness" of the difficulties of research in this area.

Speaking at a press conference to announce the report, the panel's chair, Lord Oxburgh, stated that his team had found "absolutely no evidence of any impropriety whatsoever" and that "whatever was said in the emails, the basic science seems to have been done fairly and properly." He said that many of the criticisms and allegations of scientific misconduct had been made by people "who do not like the implications of some of the conclusions" reached by the CRU's scientists. He said that the repeated FOI requests made by climate change sceptic Steve McIntyre and others could have amounted to a campaign of harassment, and the issue of how FOI laws should be applied in an academic context remained unresolved. Another panel member, Professor David Hand, commended the CRU for being explicit about the inherent uncertainties in its research data, commenting that "there is no evidence of anything underhand – the opposite, if anything, they have brought out into the open the uncertainties with what they are dealing with."

At the press conference, Hand also commented on the well publicised 1998 paper produced in the United States by scientists led by Michael E. Mann, saying that the hockey stick graph it showed was a genuine effect, but he had an "uneasy feeling" about the use of "inappropriate statistical tools" and said that the 1998 study had exaggerated the effect. He commended McIntyre for pointing out this issue. Mann subsequently told The Guardian that the study had been examined and approved in the US National Academies of Science North Report, and described Hand's comment as a "rogue opinion" not meriting "much attention or credence".

The UEA's vice-chancellor, Edward Acton, welcomed the panel's findings. Describing its report as "hugely positive", he stated that "it is especially important that, despite a deluge of allegations and smears against the CRU, this independent group of utterly reputable scientists have concluded that there was no evidence of any scientific malpractice." He criticised the way that the emails had been misrepresented, saying that "UEA has already put on record its deep regret and anger that the theft of emails from the University, and the blatant misrepresentation of their contents as revealed both in this report and the previous one by the Science and Technology Select Committee, damaged the reputation of UK climate science." The UEA issued a statement in which it accepted that "things might have been done better." It said that improvements had already been undertaken by the CRU and others in the climate science community and that the University would "continue to ensure that these imperatives are maintained."

It later emerged that the Science Assessment Panel was not assessing the quality but instead the integrity of the CRU's science. Phil Willis described this a "sleight of hand" and was not what the Parliamentary Committee he had chaired had been led to believe. There were also questions about the selection of publications examined by the panel. Lord Oxburgh said that Acton had been wrong to tell the Science and Technology Select Committee in March that his inquiry would look into the science itself. "I think that was inaccurate," Oxburgh said. "This had to be done rapidly. This was their concern. They really wanted something within a month. There was no way our panel could evaluate the science."

=== Pennsylvania State University ===
Pennsylvania State University announced in December 2009 it would review the work of Michael E. Mann, in particular looking at anything that had not already been addressed in the 2006 North Report review by the National Research Council of the National Academy of Sciences which had investigated Mann's "hockey stick graph" studies and found some faults with his 1998 methodology but agreed with the results which had been reaffirmed by later studies using different methods. In response, Mann said he would welcome the review. The inquiry committee determined on 3 February 2010 that there was no credible evidence Mann suppressed or falsified data, destroyed emails, information and/or data related to the IPCC Fourth Assessment Report, or misused privileged or confidential information. The committee did not make a definitive finding on the final point of inquiry – "whether Dr Mann seriously deviated from accepted practices within the academic community for proposing, conducting, or reporting research or other scholarly activities". The committee said that the earlier NAS inquiry had found "that Dr Mann's science did fall well within the bounds of accepted practice", but in light of the newly available information this question of conduct was to be investigated by a second panel of five prominent Penn State scientists from other scientific disciplines.

The second Investigatory Committee reported on 4 June 2010 that it had "determined that Dr Michael E. Mann did not engage in, nor did he participate in, directly or indirectly, any actions that seriously deviated from accepted practices within the academic community." Regarding his sharing unpublished manuscripts with colleagues on the assumption of implied consent, it considered such sharing to be "careless and inappropriate" without following the best practice of getting express consent from the authors in advance, though expert opinion on this varied. It said that his success in proposing research and obtaining funding for it, commenting that this "clearly places Dr Mann among the most respected scientists in his field. Such success would not have been possible had he not met or exceeded the highest standards of his profession for proposing research." Mann's extensive recognitions within the research community demonstrated that "his scientific work, especially the conduct of his research, has from the beginning of his career been judged to be outstanding by a broad spectrum of scientists." It agreed unanimously that "there is no substance" to the allegations against Mann.

Mann said he regretted not objecting to a suggestion from Jones in a 29 May 2008 message that he destroy emails. "I wish in retrospect I had told him, 'Hey, you shouldn't even be thinking about this,'" Mann said in March 2010. "I didn't think it was an appropriate request." Mann's response to Jones at the time was that he would pass on the request to another scientist. "The important thing is, I didn't delete any emails. And I don't think [Jones] did either."

=== Independent Climate Change Email Review ===
First announced in December 2009, a British investigation commissioned by the UEA and chaired by Sir Muir Russell, published its final report in July 2010. The commission cleared the scientists and dismissed allegations that they manipulated their data. The "rigour and honesty" of the scientists at the Climatic Research Unit were found not to be in doubt. The panel found that they did not subvert the peer review process to censor criticism as alleged, and that the key data needed to reproduce their findings was freely available to any "competent" researcher.

The panel did rebuke the CRU for their reluctance to release computer files, and found that a graph produced in 1999 was "misleading," though not deliberately so as necessary caveats had been included in the accompanying text. It found evidence that emails might have been deleted in order to make them unavailable should a subsequent request be made for them, though the panel did not ask anyone at CRU whether they had actually done this.

At the conclusion of the inquiry, Jones was reinstated with the newly created post of Director of Research.

=== United States Environmental Protection Agency report ===
The United States Environmental Protection Agency (EPA) had issued an "endangerment finding" in 2009 in preparation for climate regulations on excessive greenhouse gases. Petitions to reconsider this were raised by the states of Virginia and Texas, conservative activists and business groups including the United States Chamber of Commerce, the Competitive Enterprise Institute and the coal company Peabody Energy, making claims that the CRU emails undermined the science.

The EPA examined every email and concluded that there was no merit to the claims in the petitions, which "routinely misunderstood the scientific issues", reached "faulty scientific conclusions", "resorted to hyperbole", and "often cherry-pick language that creates the suggestion or appearance of impropriety, without looking deeper into the issues." In a statement issued on 29 July 2010, EPA Administrator Lisa P. Jackson said the petitions were based "on selectively edited, out-of-context data and a manufactured controversy" and provided "no evidence to undermine our determination. Excess greenhouse gases are a threat to our health and welfare."

The EPA issued a detailed report on issues raised by petitioners and responses, together with a fact sheet, and a "myths versus facts" page stating that "Petitioners say that emails disclosed from CRU provide evidence of a conspiracy to manipulate data. The media coverage after the emails were released was based on email statements quoted out of context and on unsubstantiated theories of conspiracy. The CRU emails do not show either that the science is flawed or that the scientific process has been compromised. EPA carefully reviewed the CRU emails and found no indication of improper data manipulation or misrepresentation of results."

=== Inspector General of the U.S. Department of Commerce ===
In May 2010 Senator Jim Inhofe requested the Inspector General of the United States Department of Commerce to conduct an independent review of how the National Oceanic and Atmospheric Administration (NOAA) had dealt with the emails, and whether the emails showed any wrongdoing. The report, issued on 18 February 2011, cleared the researchers and "did not find any evidence that NOAA inappropriately manipulated data or failed to adhere to appropriate peer review procedures". It noted that NOAA reviewed its climate change data as standard procedure, not in response to the controversy. One email included a cartoon image showing Inhofe and others marooned on a melting ice floe, NOAA had taken this up as a conduct issue. In response to questions raised, NOAA stated that its scientists had followed legal advice on FOIA requests for information which belonged to the IPCC and was made available by that panel. In two instances funding had been awarded to CRU, NOAA stated that it was reviewing these cases and so far understood that the funds supported climate forecasting workshops in 2002 and 2003 assisting the governments of three countries.

=== National Science Foundation ===
The Office of the Inspector General (OIG) of the National Science Foundation closed an investigation on 15 August 2011 that exonerated Michael Mann of Pennsylvania State University of charges of scientific misconduct. It found no evidence of research misconduct, and confirmed the results of earlier inquiries. The OIG reviewed the findings of the July 2010 Penn State panel, took further evidence from the university and Mann, and interviewed Mann. The OIP findings confirmed the university panel's conclusions which cleared Mann of any wrongdoing, and it stated "Lacking any evidence of research misconduct, as defined under the NSF Research Misconduct Regulation, we are closing the investigation with no further action."

== ICO decisions on Freedom of Information requests ==
In two cases, the Information Commissioner's Office (ICO) issued decisions on appeals of Freedom of Information (FOI) requests which had been turned down by the university.

David Holland, an electrical engineer from Northampton, made a 2008 FOI request for all emails to and from Keith Briffa about the IPCC Fourth Assessment Report; the university's information policy and compliance manager refused the request. On 23 November 2009, after the start of the controversy, he wrote to the Commissioner explaining in detail the relevance of the alleged CRU emails to his case, with specific reference to a May 2008 email in which Phil Jones asked others to delete emails discussing AR4 with Briffa. In January 2010 news reports highlighted that FOI legislation made it an offence to intentionally act to prevent the disclosure of requested information, but the statute of limitations meant that any prosecution had to be raised within 6 months of the alleged offence. This was discussed by the House of Commons Science and Technology Select Committee. The ICO decision on Holland's requests published on 7 July 2010 concluded that the emails indicated prima facie evidence of an offence, but as prosecution was time-barred the Commissioner had been unable to investigate the alleged offence. On the issue of the university failing to provide responses within the correct time, no further action was needed as Holland was content not to proceed with his complaint.

The Climatic Research Unit developed its gridded CRUTEM data set of land air temperature anomalies from instrumental temperature records held by National Meteorological Organisations around the world, often under formal or informal confidentiality agreements that restricted use of this raw data to academic purposes, and prevented it from being passed onto third parties. Over 95% of the CRU climate data set had been available to the public for several years before July 2009, when the university received numerous FOI requests for raw data or details of the confidentiality agreements from Stephen McIntyre and readers of his Climate Audit blog. Phil Jones of CRU announced that requests were being made to all the National Meteorological Organisations for their agreement to waive confidentiality, with the aim of publishing all the data jointly with the Met Office. McIntyre complained that data denied to him had been sent to Jones's colleague Peter Webster at the Georgia Institute of Technology for work on a joint publication, and FOI requests for this data were made by Jonathan A. Jones of the University of Oxford and Don Keiller of Anglia Ruskin University. Both requests were refused by the UEA by 11 September 2009. Though some National Meteorological Organisations gave full or conditional agreement to waive confidentiality, others failed to respond, and the request was explicitly refused by Trinidad and Tobago and Poland. In discussions with the ICO, the university argued that the data was publicly available from the Met organisations, and the lack of agreement exempted the remaining data. In its decision released on 23 June 2011, the ICO stated that the data was not easily available, and required the university to release the data covered by the FOIA request. On 27 July 2011 CRU announced that the raw instrumental data not already in the public domain had been released and was available for download, with the exception of Poland which was outside the area covered by the FOIA request. The university remained concerned "that the forced release of material from a source which has explicitly refused to give permission for release could have some damaging consequences for the UK in international research collaborations."

In September 2011 the ICO issued new guidance to universities, taking into account issues raised in relation to the CRU information requests. This describes exceptions and exemptions to protect research, including allowance for internal exchange of views between academics and researchers, leaving formulation of opinions on research free from external scrutiny. It notes the benefits of actively disclosing information when it is in the public interest, and disclosure of personal email information related to public authority business.

== Media coverage ==
The initial story about the hacking originated in the blogosphere, with columnist James Delingpole picking up the term "Climategate" from an anonymous blogger on Watts Up With That?, a blog created by climate sceptic Anthony Watts. The site was one of three blogs that received links to the leaked documents on 17 November 2009. Delingpole first used the word "Climategate" in the title of his 20 November article for The Telegraph: "Climategate: the final nail in the coffin of 'Anthropogenic Global Warming'?" A week later, his co-worker Christopher Booker gave Delingpole credit for coining the term. Following the release of documents in the blogosphere, unproven allegations and personal attacks against scientists increased and made their way into the traditional media. Physicist Mark Boslough of the University of New Mexico noted that many of the attacks on scientists came from "bloggers, editorial writers, Fox News pundits, and radio talk show hosts who have called them liars and vilified them as frauds". According to Chris Mooney and Sheril Kirshenbaum in their book Unscientific America (2010), the accusations originated in right-wing media and blogs, "especially on outlets like Fox News". Journalist Suzanne Goldenberg of The Guardian reported that according to an analysis by Media Matters, "Fox had tried to delegitimise the work of climate scientists in its coverage of the hacked emails from the University of East Anglia" and had "displayed a pattern of trying to skew coverage in favour of the fringe minority which doubts the existence of climate change".

The intense media coverage of the documents stolen from climate researchers at the University of East Anglia created public confusion about the scientific consensus on climate change, leading several publications to comment on the propagation of the controversy in the media in the wake of a series of investigations that cleared the scientists of any wrongdoing. In an editorial, The New York Times described the coverage as a "manufactured controversy" and expressed hope that the investigations clearing the scientists "will receive as much circulation as the original, diversionary controversies". Writing for Newsweek, journalist Sharon Begley called the controversy a "highly orchestrated, manufactured scandal", noting that the public was unlikely to change their mind. Regardless of the reports exonerating the scientists, Begley noted that "one of the strongest, most-repeated findings in the psychology of belief is that once people have been told X, especially if X is shocking, if they are later told, 'No, we were wrong about X,' most people still believe X."

Jean-Pascal van Ypersele, vice-chair of the Intergovernmental Panel on Climate Change (IPCC) and science historian Naomi Oreskes said that the "attacks on climate science that were made ahead of the Copenhagen climate change summit were 'organised' to undermine efforts to tackle global warming and mirror the earlier tactics of the tobacco industry". Noting the media circus that occurred when the story first broke, Oreskes and Erik Conway writing about climate change denial, said that following the investigations "the vindication of the climate scientists has received very little coverage at all. Vindication is not as sexy as accusation, and many people are still suspicious. After all, some of those emails, taken out of context, sounded damning. But what they show is that climate scientists are frustrated, because for two decades they have been under attack."

Bill Royce, head of the European practice on energy, environment and climate change at the United States communications firm Burson-Marsteller, also described the incident as an organised effort to discredit climate science. He said that it was not a single scandal, but "a sustained and coordinated campaign" aimed at undermining the credibility of the science. Disproportionate reporting of the original story, "widely amplified by climate deniers", meant that the reports that cleared the scientists received far less coverage than the original allegations, he said. Journalist Curtis Brainard of the Columbia Journalism Review criticised newspapers and magazines for failing to give prominent coverage to the findings of the review panels and said that "readers need to understand that while there is plenty of room to improve the research and communications process, its fundamental tenets remain as solid as ever". CNN media critic Howard Kurtz expressed similar sentiments.

In June 2021, the BBC reported that Climategate would be the subject of a film entitled The Trick with actors Jason Watkins, George MacKay, Victoria Hamilton, Jerome Flynn and Adrian Edmondson.

In November 2021, BBC Radio 4 broadcast a five-part series, The Hack that Changed the World, about the issue; it was presented by BBC Security Correspondent Gordon Corera.

== Public opinion and political fallout ==
Jon Krosnick, professor of communication, political science and psychology at Stanford University, said that scientists were overreacting. Referring to his own poll results of the American public, he said: "It's another funny instance of scientists ignoring science." Krosnick found that "Very few professions enjoy the level of confidence from the public that scientists do, and those numbers haven't changed much in a decade. We don't see a lot of evidence that the general public in the United States is picking up on the (University of East Anglia) emails. It's too inside baseball."

The Christian Science Monitor, in an article titled "Climate scientists exonerated in 'climategate' but public trust damaged", stated: "While public opinion had steadily moved away from belief in man-made global warming before the leaked CRU emails, that trend has only accelerated." Paul Krugman, columnist for The New York Times, argued that this, along with all other incidents that called into question the scientific consensus on climate change, was "a fraud concocted by opponents of climate action, then bought into by many in the news media". But UK journalist Fred Pearce called the slow response of climate scientists "a case study in how not to respond to a crisis" and "a public relations disaster".

A. A. Leiserowitz, Director of the Yale University Project on Climate Change, and colleagues found in 2010 that:

Climategate had a significant effect on public beliefs in global warming and trust in scientists. The loss of trust in scientists, however, was primarily among individuals with a strongly individualistic worldview or politically conservative ideology. Nonetheless, Americans overall continue to trust scientists more than other sources of information about global warming.

In late 2011, Steven F. Hayward wrote that "Climategate did for the global warming controversy what the Pentagon Papers did for the Vietnam war 40 years ago: It changed the narrative decisively." An editorial in Nature said that many in the media "were led by the nose, by those with a clear agenda, to a sizzling scandal that steadily defused as the true facts and context were made clear".

== Further release, 2011 ==
On 22 November 2011, a second set of approximately 5,000 emails, apparently hacked from University of East Anglia servers at the same time as those in the 2009 release, was posted on a Russian server, with links distributed to the message boards on several climate-sceptic websites. A message accompanying the emails quoted selective passages from them, highlighting many of the same issues raised following the original incident. Juliette Jowit and Leo Hickman of The Guardian said that the new release was "an apparent attempt to undermine public support for international action to tackle climate change" with the start of the 2011 United Nations Climate Change Conference scheduled in Durban, South Africa, a week later. Nature described the further release as a "poor sequel" and claimed that "it is hard for anyone except the most committed conspiracy theorist to see much of interest in the content of the released e-mails, even taken out of context".

== See also ==
- Climate change in the United Kingdom
- Global warming conspiracy theory
- Global warming controversy
- List of -gate scandals and controversies
