= Global warming hiatus =

Period of little Earth temperature change

With deliberately cherry picking appropriate time periods, here 1998-2012, a "pause" can be created, even when there is an ongoing warming trend.

Temperature data from various scientific organizations worldwide show a high correlation regarding the progress and extent of global warming.

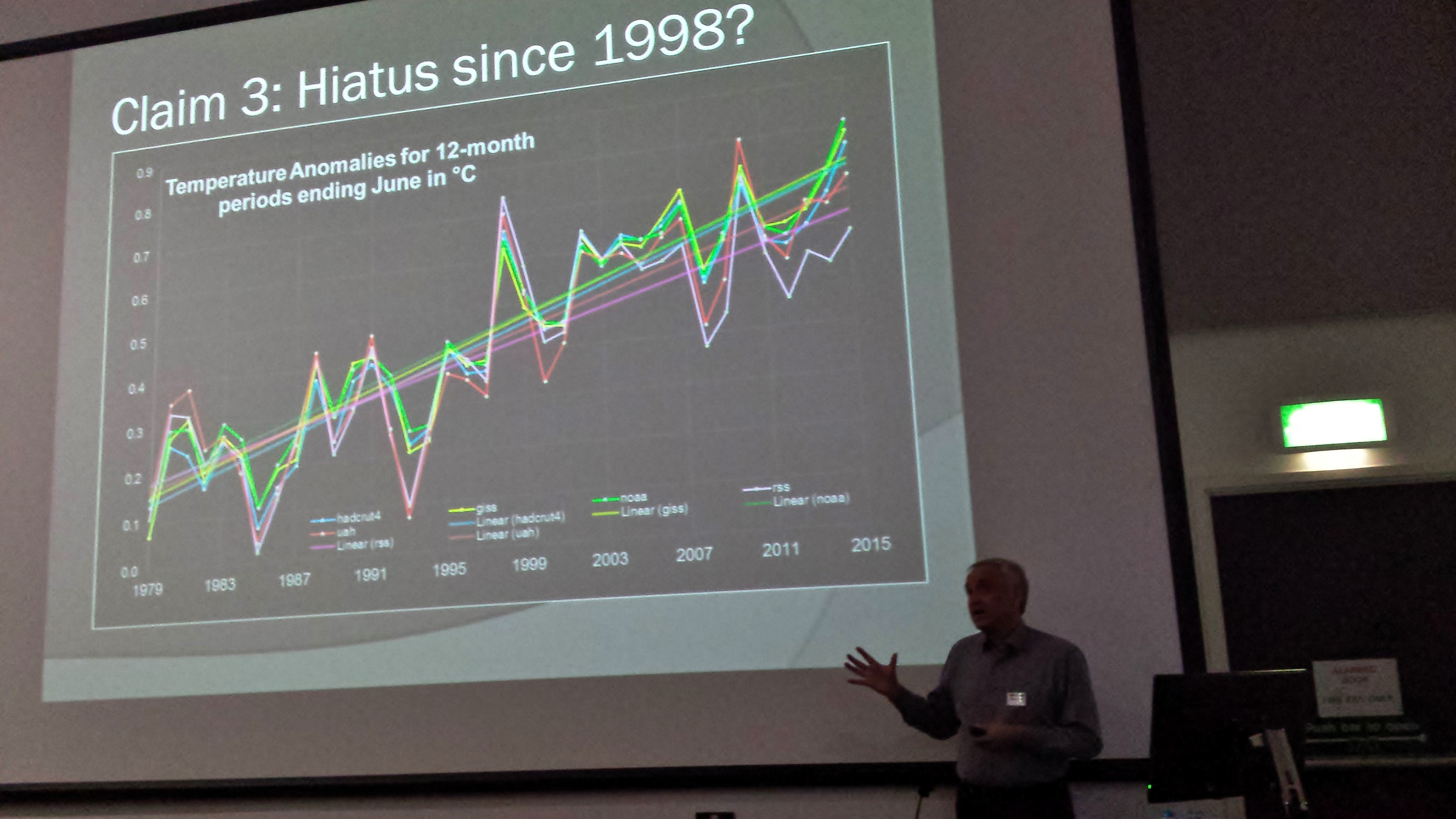
Amardeo Sarma lecturing about climate change denialism at the European Skeptics Congress, hosted by the Association for Skeptical Enquiry

A global warming hiatus, also sometimes referred to as a global warming pause or a global warming slowdown, is a period of relatively little change in globally averaged surface temperatures. In the current episode of global warming many such 15-year periods appear in the surface temperature record, along with robust evidence of the long-term warming trend. Such a "hiatus" is shorter than the 30-year periods that climate is classically averaged over.

Publicity has surrounded claims of a global warming hiatus during the period 1998–2013. The exceptionally warm El Niño year of 1998 was an outlier from the continuing temperature trend, and so subsequent annual temperatures gave the appearance of a hiatus: by January 2006, it appeared to some that global warming had stopped or paused. A 2009 study showed that decades without warming were not exceptional, and in 2011 a study showed that if allowances were made for known variability, the rising temperature trend continued unabated. There was increased public interest in 2013 in the run-up to publication of the IPCC Fifth Assessment Report, and despite concerns that a 15-year period was too short to determine a meaningful trend, the IPCC included a section on a hiatus, which it defined as a much smaller increasing linear trend over the 15 years from 1998 to 2012, than over the 60 years from 1951 to 2012. Various studies examined possible causes of the short-term slowdown. Even though the overall climate system has continued to accumulate energy due to Earth's positive energy budget, the available temperature readings at the Earth's surface indicate slower rates of increase in surface warming than in the prior decade. Since measurements at the top of the atmosphere show that Earth is receiving more energy than it is radiating back into space, the retained energy should be producing warming in the Earth's climate system.

Research reported in July 2015 on an updated NOAA dataset casts doubt on the existence of a hiatus, and it finds no indication of a slowdown even in earlier years. Scientists working on other datasets welcomed this study, though they have expressed the view that the recent warming trend was less than in previous periods of the same length. Subsequently, a detailed study supports the conclusion that warming is continuing, but it also find there was less warming between 2001 and 2010 than climate models had predicted, and that this slowdown might be attributed to short-term variations in the Pacific decadal oscillation (PDO), which was negative during that period. Another review finds "no substantive evidence" of a pause in global warming. A statistical study of global temperature data since 1970 concludes that the term "hiatus" or "pause" is not justified. Some climate scientists, however, have questioned the claim that the hiatus is not supported by evidence, arguing that the recent corrections in data do not negate the existence of a hiatus.

Independent of these discussions about data and measurements for earlier years, 2015 turned out to be much warmer than any of the earlier years, already before El Niño conditions started. The warmth of 2015 largely ended any remaining scientific credibility of claims that the supposed "hiatus" since 1998 had any significance for the long-term warming trend, and 2016 was even slightly warmer. In January 2017, a study published in the journal Science Advances cast further doubt on the existence of a recent pause, with more evidence that ocean temperatures have been underestimated. An April 2017 study found the data consistent with a steady warming trend globally since the 1970s, with fluctuations within the expected range of short term variability. A November 2017 joint study by scientists at the University of Fairbanks and Beijing University found that when missing data from the rapidly warming Arctic were interpolated and included in global temperature averages, the so-called hiatus disappeared entirely.

== Evidence ==
=== Surface temperature changes: hiatus periods ===
Climate is the statistics (usually, mean or variability) of weather: the classical period for averaging weather variables is 30 years in accordance with the definition set by the World Meteorological Organization. Instrumental temperature records have shown a robust multi-decadal long-term trend of global warming since the end of the 19th century, reversing longer term cooling in previous centuries as seen in paleoclimate records. There has been considerable variability at shorter interannual to decadal periods, with hiatus periods showing less certain short-term trends. The 1998–2012 hiatus shows a rise of 0.05 [–0.05 to +0.15] °C per decade, compared with a longer term rise of 0.12 [0.08 to 0.14] °C per decade over the period from 1951 to 2012. The appearance of hiatus is sensitive to the start and end years chosen: a 15-year period starting in 1996 shows a rate of increase of 0.14 [0.03 to 0.24] °C per decade, but taking 15 years from 1997 the rate reduces to 0.07 [–0.02 to 0.18] °C per decade.

=== Other aspects of the climate system ===
While hiatus periods have appeared in surface-air temperature records, other components of the climate system associated with warming have continued. Sea level rise has not stopped in recent years, and Arctic sea ice decline has continued. There have been repeated records set for extreme surface temperatures.

== Development of perception of post-1998 hiatus ==
One deceptive approach is cherry picking data from short time periods to assert that global average temperatures are not rising. Blue trendlines show short-term countertrends that mask longer-term warming trends that are shown by red trendlines. Such representations have been applied to the so-called global warming hiatus (blue rectangle with blue dots, in upper right).

The warm El Niño year of 1998 was exceptional: the IPCC Third Assessment Report of 2001 highlighted that the "high global temperature associated with the 1997 to 1998 El Niño event stands out as an extreme event, even taking into account the recent rate of warming." Opponents of action on global warming used this peak to misleadingly suggest that warming had stopped; an April 2006 opinion piece by Bob Carter in the Daily Telegraph announced an 8-year halt, but was soon rebutted. The IPCC Fourth Assessment Report in 2007 reported that "2005 and 1998 were the warmest two years in the instrumental global surface-air temperature record since 1850. Surface temperatures in 1998 were enhanced by the major 1997–1998 El Niño but no such strong anomaly was present in 2005. Eleven of the last 12 years (1995 to 2006) – the exception being 1996 – rank among the 12 warmest years on record since 1850." The IPCC report was disputed by an open letter in the National Post with 94 signatories, which said "there has been no net global warming since 1998. That the current temperature plateau follows a late 20th-century period of warming is consistent with the continuation today of natural multi-decadal or millennial climate cycling."

There were further claims in blogs and media of lack of warming since 1998, and an Investor's Business Daily article in 2008 even claimed the planet was cooling. In April 2009, a NOAA study showed that similar short- term periods with no trend or even cooling had occurred previously in the years since 1901, and could even be found during the warming trend since 1975: it was easy to "cherry pick" the period 1998–2008 to support one view, but 1999–2008 showed a strong warming trend. They used computer simulations of future climate to show that it was "possible, and indeed likely, to have a period as long as a decade or two of 'cooling' or no warming superimposed on a longer-term warming trend." In July 2009 Jeb Bush said that global warming might not be occurring as mean temperatures had been cooler over six years. The decade to the end of 2010 was again the warmest on record, but David Rose in the Mail on Sunday argued that, excluding the 1998 "blip", global temperatures had been flat for 15 years. A November 2011 study by statistician Grant Foster and Stefan Rahmstorf showed that after allowing for known short-term variability, there had been unabated warming since 1998 with no reduction from the rate over the preceding decade. In January 2012 Rose claimed that the latest global temperatures showed 15 years without warming: the Met Office described this as "entirely misleading".

In January 2013 James Hansen and colleagues published their updated analysis that temperatures had continued at a high level despite strong La Niña conditions, and said the "5-year mean global temperature has been flat for a decade, which we interpret as a combination of natural variability and a slowdown in the growth rate of the net climate forcing", noting "that the 10 warmest years in the record all occurred since 1998." Under the heading "Global Warming Standstill" they "noted that the 'standstill' temperature is at a much higher level than existed at any year in the prior decade except for the single year 1998, which had the strongest El Nino of the century. However, the standstill has led to a widespread assertion that 'global warming has stopped'." The Economist led an article 30 March 2013 with the sentence "Over the past 15 years air temperatures at the Earth's surface have been flat while greenhouse-gas emissions have continued to soar, quoting Hansen as saying that ""the five-year mean global temperature has been flat for a decade." It discussed possible explanations of "the recent hiatus in rising temperatures", and suggested that it implied lower climate sensitivity. There was a surge in media interest setting a misleading narrative, as in the Reuters headline "Climate scientists struggle to explain warming slowdown". At the Science Media Centre in London in July 2013, journalists met Met Office scientists and were given a briefing document with three papers on "the recent pause in global warming" in surface temperatures. These said other indicators continued to show warming, at least part of the pause related to heat being exchanged into deep oceans, and it did not alter the risks of future warming or invalidate the physics behind the models: it meant only a 10% reduction in the most probable projection, so "the warming that we might have expected by 2050 would be delayed by only a few years".

In preparing the IPCC Fifth Assessment Report (AR5), representatives of the U.S. government and the European Union wanted details of the slowdown or "hiatus", Germany and Hungary were concerned that a 15-year period was too short to determine a meaningful trend, but the IPCC included discussion of the topic. One of the lead authors, Dennis L. Hartmann, subsequently said; "Going into the IPCC this time, I would have said that, well, the trend over a 15-year record is not really very meaningful, because of the natural interannual variability of the climate system. But as the IPCC evolved, it became more and more of a public issue, so we felt we had to say something about it, even though from an observational perspective, it's not a very reliable measure of long-term warming." He said "the apparent reduction in the observed warming rate" was "interesting on purely scientific grounds, but it does not have a huge impact on the scientific assessment and does not alter the basic facts." Research cited in the report had to be published by 15 March, which excluded more recent work such as a paper by NCAR scientists including Kevin E. Trenberth indicating that increased heat was going into ocean depths.

A month before formal AR5 publication, a leaked draft of the report noted that "Models do not generally reproduce the observed reduction in surface warming trend over the last 10–15 years", but lacked clear explanations, and attracted wide media coverage. On 16 August Reuters said the "panel will try to explain why global temperatures, while still increasing, have risen more slowly since about 1998 even though greenhouse gas concentrations have hit repeated record highs in that time". The BBC on 19 August reported IPCC warnings that the final text would vary, and said "The panel will also outline why global temperatures have been rising more slowly since 1998, a controversial slowdown that scientists have been struggling to explain." It said the possibility that climate sensitivity was lower than previous estimates had been argued by "many sceptics" as a key factor, and "a good reason not to believe the more extreme predictions of those they dismiss as warmist conspirators." Coverage varied: on 22 August the National Geographic said the "draft IPCC report also dismisses a recent slowdown in global warming, attributing it to short-term factors." On 26 September, the day before formal publication, CBC News quoted The Heritage Foundation under the headline "Climate change reports temperature hiatus fuels skeptics".

In late night negotiations over wording, the IPCC added clarifications including "due to natural variability, trends based on short records are very sensitive to the beginning and end dates and do not in general reflect long-term climate trends", but at the press conference releasing the IPCC Summary for Policymakers on 27 September, journalists focussed questions on the "pause" rather than the overall conclusions. This focus resulted in headlines such as "Global Warming Slowdown Seen as Emissions Rise to Record" from Reuters. The National Post used the subheading "IPCC report skeptics seize on lull in global warming". Even Nature headlined their news report "IPCC: Despite hiatus, climate change here to stay", though it said that "the 'hiatus' since the record hot year of 1998 — probably due to increased heat uptake by the oceans — is no sign that global warming has stopped, as some would like to hope", and quoted climatologist Thomas Stocker saying that "Comparing short-term observations with long-term model projections is inappropriate", and adding "We know that there is a lot of natural fluctuation in the climate system. A 15-year hiatus is not so unusual even though the jury is out as to what exactly may have caused the pause." He said that claims dismissing climate models would only be justified if "temperature were to remain constant for the next 20 years", and Brian Hoskins said other factors showed climate change.

In a statement to the press in March 2016, Professor David Vaughan of the British Antarctic Survey said that recent increases in global temperature were not due to an unusually severe El Niño, but that the opposite is true. "This is a catch-up of a recent hiatus that has occurred in rising global temperatures. We are returning to normality: rising temperatures. This is an absolute warning of the dangers that lie ahead."

== Factors ==
=== Temperature dataset coverage and homogenization ===
The instrumental temperature record does not cover the entire globe: there are areas of incomplete or missing data, particularly in polar regions and parts of Africa. The main temperature datasets take different approaches to allowing for this: HadCRUT does not extrapolate, and assumes that the global mean applies. When these regions have a different trend to the global average as at present, this causes a bias in the result which understates overall warming. The other datasets interpolate, producing differing trends. A 2014 study introduced a more sophisticated method of Kriging from the UAH satellite dataset, and found that this considerably reduced the hiatus.

Global (land and ocean) surface temperature anomaly time series with new analysis (solid black) versus no corrections for time-dependent biases (blue). The new analysis shows a long-term trend since 1880 that is less than that which would be estimated without corrections. And, in particular, the trend since 1998 is not significantly different from that found for the new analysis since 1880.

Homogenization is necessary for all climate data to correct for non-climatic changes, such as introduction of different measurement instruments, changes in location of the instruments, or differences in the time of day that measurements are taken. The NOAA temperature dataset is regularly updated with refinements improving the allowance for known biases, including the effects of past changes in methods of collecting temperatures. In 2015 it changed from the Global Historical Climatology Network to the new International Surface Temperature Initiative databank which includes many more stations giving wider coverage of land surface temperatures, and the latest Extended Reconstructed Sea Surface Temperature dataset (version 4) which made improved allowances for biases, including the phased changeover from measuring ship water intake to using automatic buoys: the previous version made a simpler allowance for this. An article published in the American Association for the Advancement of Science (AAAS) Science journal in June 2015 by a team led by Thomas R. Karl, director of the NOAA data center, reported that these adjustments made very little difference to the temperature record, but the small change in recent years was sufficient to indicate that there had been no hiatus in the period from 1998 to 2014. They used the IPCC definition of the supposed hiatus as a slowdown in rate of temperature increase from 1998 to 2012, compared to the rate from 1951 to 2012, and again found no support for the idea of a "hiatus" or slowdown.

=== Natural variability ===
Natural climate variability can appear to slow down surface warming over short periods, but does not refute long-term climate change trends. Short-term hiatus periods of global warming are compatible with long-term climate change patterns. The North Atlantic Oscillation (NAO) leads to multidecadal variability in Northern Hemispheric mean surface temperature by 15–20 years through a delayed effect on the North Atlantic Ocean, and can be a useful predictor of multidecadal periods of warming and cooling in both AMO and Northern Hemispheric mean surface temperature. A study published in January 2015 proposed that the hiatus resulted from a 60-year oscillatory pattern of natural variability associated with the AMO and PDO, interacting with a secular warming trend due mainly to human caused increases in greenhouse gas levels.

==== Effects of oceans ====
One proposal is that the hiatus was a part of natural climate variability, specifically related to decadal cooling in the eastern equatorial Pacific in the La Niña phase of the El Niño–Southern Oscillation (ENSO). This has been explained as due to unprecedented strengthening of Pacific trade winds in the last 20 years, so that surface warming has been substantially slowed by increased subsurface ocean heat uptake caused by increased subduction in the Pacific shallow overturning cells, and increased equatorial upwelling in the central and eastern Pacific. A March 2014 study found that climate models assuming natural variability which matched subsequent observations of ENSO phasing had produced realistic estimates of 15-year trends.

A study published on August 3, 2014 reported that the rapid warming of the Atlantic Ocean has increased trade winds, thereby cooling temperatures in the Pacific Ocean. This, the study concluded, contributed to the hiatus because such winds trap heat in the deep ocean. Another study published later that month found evidence that a cycle of ocean currents in the Atlantic influences global temperatures by sinking large amounts of heat beneath the oceans, and suggested the hiatus might continue for ten more years because each phase of this cycle lasts for thirty years. The 60- to 80-year cycle of the atmospheric and oceanic variability over the North Atlantic was also linked to the hiatus by two studies published in 2013 and was used to infer the length of the hiatus. A new "delayed oscillator theory" of the North Atlantic decadal-scale air-sea coupling was further proposed in 2015 to understand the underlying physical mechanisms of the 60-80-year-quasi-periodic natural climate multidecadal variability.

Two papers were published by scientists of the NASA Sea Level Change Team in October 2014 in the same issue of Nature Climate Change. According to an October 6, 2014 NASA press release related to the papers, "One of the most prominent ideas is that the bottom half of the ocean is taking up the slack, but supporting evidence is slim." In this press release, entitled, "NASA Study Finds Earth's Ocean Abyss Has Not Warmed," NASA discussed research it had conducted that was "the first to test the idea using satellite observations, as well as direct temperature measurements of the upper ocean." NASA stated in this release, "The cold waters of Earth's deep ocean have not warmed measurably since 2005, according to a new NASA study, leaving unsolved the mystery of why global warming appears to have slowed in recent years." With respect to the upper ocean, the release noted, "The temperature of the top half of the world's oceans – above the 1.24-mile mark – is still climbing, but not fast enough to account for the stalled air temperatures." NASA also emphasized in the same release, "Study coauthor Josh Willis of JPL said these findings do not throw suspicion on climate change itself. 'The sea level is still rising,' Willis noted. 'We're just trying to understand the nitty-gritty details.'".

More specifically, one of these NASA studies was based on the fact that water expands as it gets warmer, and a straightforward subtraction calculation: From the total amount of sea level rise, they subtracted that due to the calculated expansion of the upper ocean down to 2,000 metres' (1.2 mi) depth based on data from Argo buoys, and that due to added meltwater worldwide. The remainder, representing the amount of sea level rise caused by warming in the deep ocean below that depth, was "essentially zero." Some recent studies reporting deep-ocean warming were referring to the upper half of the ocean, but below its topmost layer which goes down to about 700 metres' (0.43 mi) depth. According to the other NASA study, the upper layers of the Southern Ocean warmed at a much greater rate between 1970 and 2005 than previously thought (24–58 percent more than earlier estimates), because before the deployment of Argo buoys, temperature measurements in the Southern Ocean were "spotty, at best."

That the oceans warmed in the past significantly faster than we thought would imply that the effects of climate change could be worse than currently expected, placing the planet's sensitivity to CO_{2} toward the higher end of its possible range.

A study published in December 2014 found that it is likely that a significant cause of the hiatus was increased heat uptake across the Atlantic Ocean, Southern Ocean, and Equatorial Pacific Ocean.

A study published in February 2015 found that Atlantic Multidecadal Oscillation and the Pacific Decadal Oscillation substantially accounted for the hiatus, and predicted that these cycles would soon begin to exert the opposite effect on global temperatures.

A study published in November 2015 found evidence of "a phase difference between top-of-the-atmosphere radiation and global mean surface temperature such that ocean heat uptake tends to slow down during the surface warming hiatus." The same study reported that this finding was consistent with observations.

==== Volcanic activity ====
Several studies have proposed that possible slower surface warming during this period was caused in part by increased sulfur emissions from volcanic activity. A study published in November 2014 found that more sulfur dioxide had been emitted from small volcanoes than previously thought over the period 2000-2013. The study's lead author, David Ridley, said this could help explain why climate models did not predict slower surface warming.

=== Other factors ===
Additional proposed causes of the decreased rate of surface warming in about 1999-2014 include the emission of pine-smelling vapors from pine forests, which have been shown to turn into aerosols, and the ban on chlorofluorocarbons as a result of the Montreal Protocol, since they were potent greenhouse gases in addition to their ozone-depleting properties. Spurious differences in observed warming rates may also arise from the mathematics of trend analysis itself, particularly when the study period is brief and regression assumptions are violated.

== Length of hiatus in relation to climate models ==
Two independent studies published in August 2014 concluded that, once surface temperatures start rising again, it is most likely that "they will keep going up without a break for the rest of the century, unless we cut greenhouse gas emissions." Watanabe et al said, "this warming hiatus originated from eastern equatorial Pacific cooling associated with strengthening of trade winds," and that while decadal climate variability has a considerable effect on global mean surface temperatures, its influence is gradually decreasing compared to the ongoing man-made global warming. Maher et al found that under the existing and projected high rates of greenhouse gas emissions there is little chance of another hiatus decade occurring after 2030, even if there were a large volcanic eruption after that time. They went on to say that most non-volcanic warming hiatuses are associated with enhanced cooling at the surface in the equatorial Pacific, which is linked to the Interdecadal Pacific Oscillation.

== Reports by scientific bodies ==
=== National Academy of Sciences-Royal Society Report ===
A joint report from the UK Royal Society and the US National Academy of Sciences in February 2014 said that there is no "pause" in climate change and that the temporary and short-term slowdown in the rate of increase in average global surface temperatures in the non-polar regions is likely to start accelerating again in the near future. "Globally averaged surface temperature has slowed down. I wouldn't say it's paused. It depends on the datasets you look at. If you look at datasets that include the Arctic, it is clear that global temperatures are still increasing," said Tim Palmer, a co-author of the report and a professor at University of Oxford.

=== World Meteorological Organisation climate report ===
When announcing the annual World Meteorological Organisation climate report in March 2014, the WMO secretary-general Michel Jarraud said that there had been no pause, with 2013 continuing a long-term warming trend showing "no standstill in global warming". 2013 had been the sixth-warmest year on record, and 13 of the 14 warmest years on record had occurred since the start of 2000. He said that "The warming of our oceans has accelerated, and at lower depths. More than 90 percent of the excess energy trapped by greenhouse gases is stored in the oceans."

The 2013 annual report stated that "While the rate at which surface air temperatures are rising has slowed in recent years, heat continues to be trapped in the Earth system, mostly as increased ocean heat content. About 93 percent of the excess heat trapped in the Earth system between 1971 and 2010 was taken up by the ocean." From 2000 to 2013 the oceans had gained around three times as much heat as in the preceding 20 years, and while before 2000 most of the heat had been trapped between the sea surface and 700 meters (0.43 mi) depth, from 2000 to 2013 most heat had been stored between 700 and 2,000 meters (2,300 and 6,600 ft) depth. It proposed this could be due to changes in atmospheric and ocean circulation around the tropical Pacific Ocean, interacting with the El Niño–Southern Oscillation and the Pacific Decadal Oscillation.
