= GMST =

GMST may refer to:

- Global mean surface temperature, sometimes abbreviated as Global surface temperature (GST)
- Greenwich Mean Sidereal Time, a time scale based on Earth's rate of rotation measured relative to celestial objects
