= Aiguo Dai =

Chinese-American atmospheric scientist

- 戴爱国
- Education: Nanjing University, University of the Chinese Academy of Sciences, Columbia University
- Scientific career
- Fields: Atmospheric science, climatology
- Institutions: University at Albany, SUNY, National Center for Atmospheric Research
- Thesis: Global precipitation variability and its relationship with other climate changes (1996)

Aiguo Dai (Chinese: 戴爱国) is a Chinese-American atmospheric scientist and professor in the Department of Atmospheric and Environmental Sciences at the University at Albany, SUNY. Before joining the University at Albany in 2012 as an associate professor, he worked at the National Center for Atmospheric Research, which he first joined in 1999 as a project scientist.

== Work ==
An ISI highly cited researcher, Dai's areas of research include climate variability and projecting future climate change, such as changes in the global water cycle and droughts. For example, he published a study in 2010 projecting that many heavily populated areas of the world (such as southern Europe and northern Africa) could see severe drought before 2100. He has also published a study showing that the difference between the global warming hiatus and model predictions was largely due to the Interdecadal Pacific Oscillation. He has also studied changes in drought worldwide under global warming, finding that drought has gotten worse since 1923.
