= Hockey stick graph =

Type of graph with a sharp turn

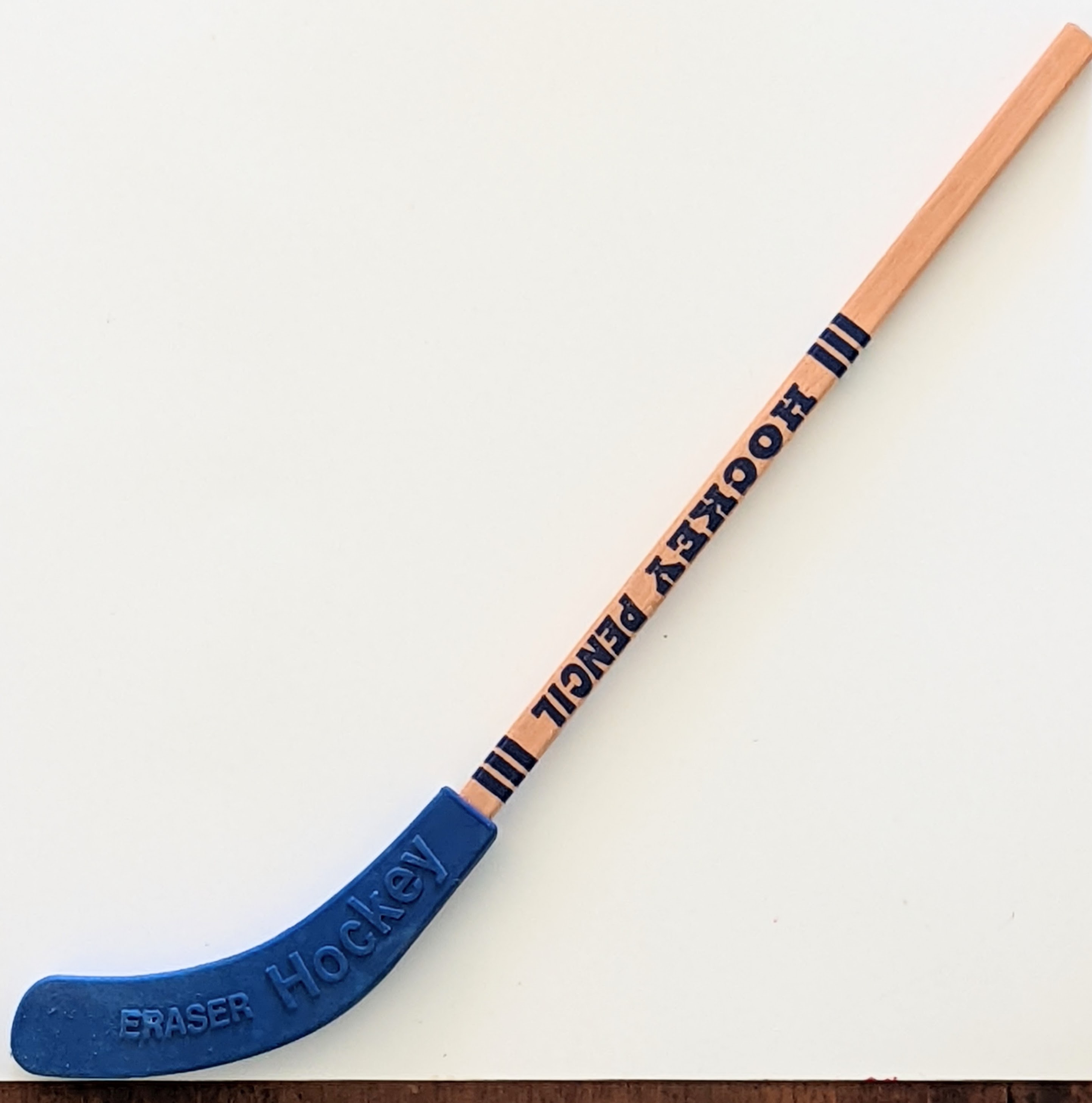
A "hockey pencil" imitating the shape of an ice hockey stick, with the eraser being the blade; its bottom edge here is a fair representation of a hockey stick graph. If the graph starts above zero and drops a little before rising, it may be called a J curve.

A hockey stick graph or hockey stick curve is a graph, or curve shape, that resembles an ice hockey stick, in that it turns sharply from a nearly flat "blade" to a long "handle".

In economics, marketing, and dose–response relationships, a hockey stick graph is one in which the "blade" is near zero (hugging the floor) before the graph turns upward to a long nearly straight increasing section. By contrast, in climate science, the well-known hockey stick graph (global temperature) describing 1000 years of global or hemispheric temperature has the "handle" horizontal and "blade" turning upward. This difference of viewpoint is remarked on in a 2020 novel about climate change:

Insurance companies in a panic at last year's reports. Pay-outs at about one hundred billion USD a year now, going higher fast, as in hockey stick graph. Insurance companies insured by re-insurance. These now holding short end of stick (tall end of stick?).

— Kim Stanley Robinson, The Ministry for the Future: A Novel

The northern hemisphere hockey stick graph – smoothed curve shown in blue with its uncertainty range in light blue, overlaid with green dots showing the 30-year global average of the 2013 reconstruction. The red curve shows measured global mean temperature, according to HadCRUT4 data from 1850 to 2013.

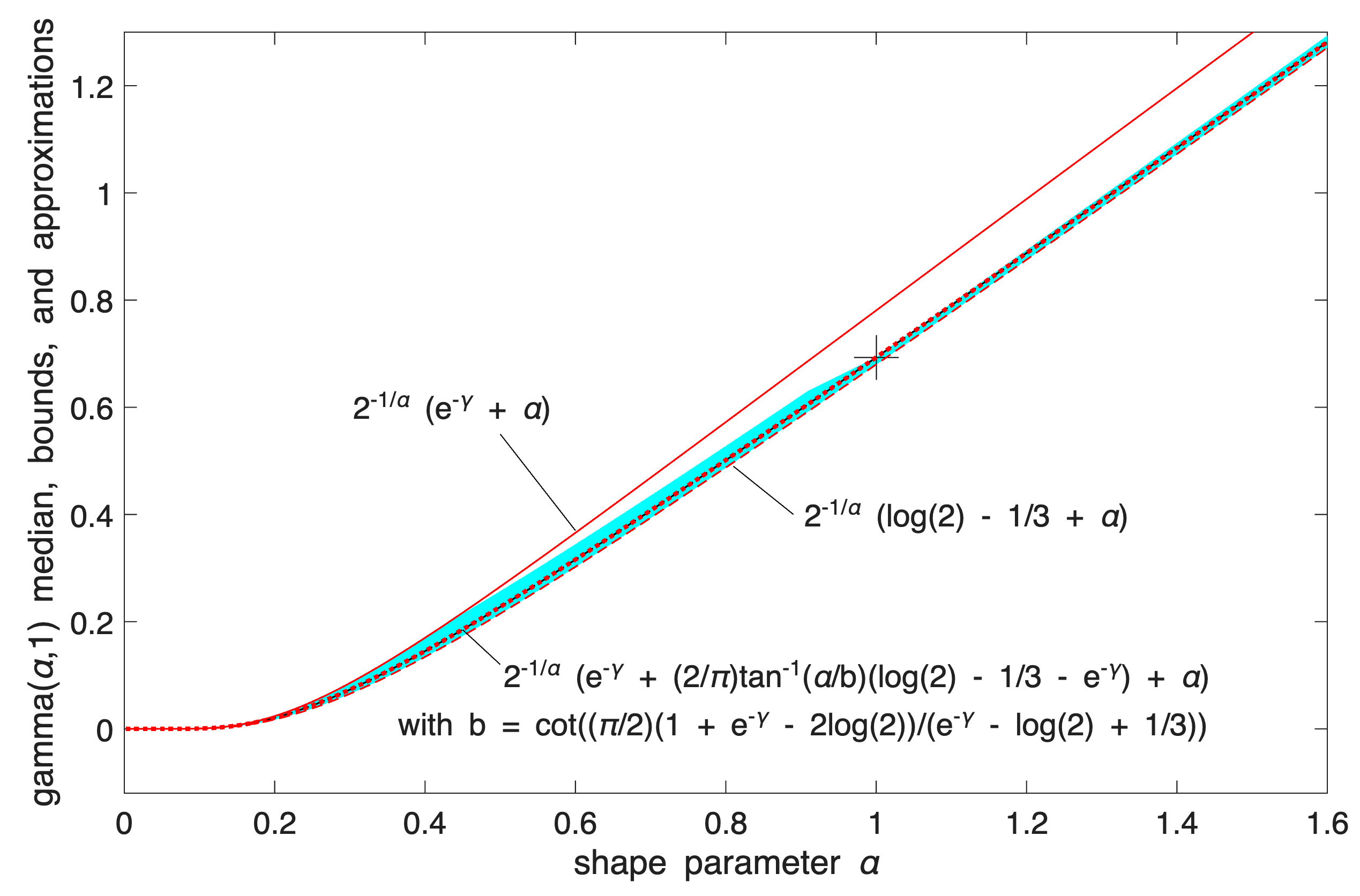
Functions with a hockey stick curve shape that bound or approximate the median of a gamma distribution

== See also ==
- Hockey stick graph (global temperature)
