= Thomas R. Karl =

Former director of the NOAA

Thomas R. Karl (born 22 November 1951, in Evergreen Park, Illinois) is the former director of the National Oceanic and Atmospheric Administration's National Centers for Environmental Information (NCEI). He joined the National Climate Centre in 1980, and when that became the National Climatic Data Center, he continued as a researcher, becoming a Lab Chief, Senior Scientist and ultimately Director of the Center. When it merged with other centers to become NCEI in 2015, he became its first director. He retired on 4 August 2016.

== Global warming hiatus debate ==
Karl was the lead on a study on the question of the possible existence of a hiatus in global warming, as discussed in the IPCC Fifth Assessment Report . In the study, published in the American Association for the Advancement of Science (AAAS) Science journal in June 2015 and based on previously published datasets, they found no indication of a slowdown, even in the period from 1998 to 2012 which had been highlighted by the IPCC. This analysis incorporated the latest homogenization corrections for known biases in ocean temperature measurements as published by others in NOAA's Extended Reconstructed Sea Surface Temperature dataset version 4, and land temperatures from the new International Surface Temperature Initiative dataset, integrated with NOAA's Global Historical Climatology Network. Scientists working on other datasets welcomed this study, though the view was expressed at the time that the short term warming trend had been slower than in previous periods of the same length. After he published these results, Karl was attacked by climate change denialists, including Lamar Smith, chair of the House Science Committee. In 2017 the findings of the Karl et al. study were confirmed by another group of scientists using different methodologies.

== Awards ==
- Verner E. Suomi Award by the American Meteorological Society
- Amer. Assoc. of State Climatologists, Landsberg Award(1993)
- Amer. Meteor. Soc. Editors Award, J. Climate (1988)
- Department of Commerce Gold Medal (1991)
- NOAA Administrator's Award (1989)
- Department of Commerce Bronze Medal (1988)

== Service ==
- Editor Journal of Climate
- Associate Editor Climatic Change
- National Research Council
- Climate Research Committee (1991–present)
- Panel on EOSDIS (1992–94)
- Panel on Policy Implications of Greenhouse Warming (1990–1992)
- Intergovernmental Panel on Climate Change: Lead Author 1995, 1992, 1990
- Public Affairs: Numerous news media interviews, testimony to U.S. Congress and briefings to cabinet-level officials and Vice President of the US.

== Papers ==
- Karl, T.R., R.W. Knight, and B. Baker. 2000. The record breaking global temperatures of 1997 and 1998: Evidence for an increase in the rate of global warming. Geophysical Research Letters 27(March 1):719-722. (press release)
