= Jonathan A. Jones =

British physicist (born 1967)

Jonathan Jones
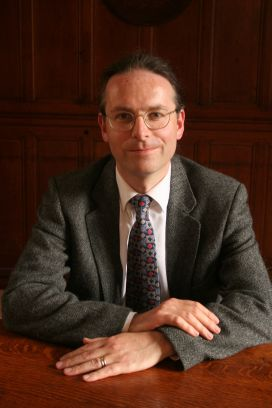
- Born: 1967 (age 58–59)
- Education: University of Oxford (BA, DPhil)
- Scientific career
- Fields: Quantum computation
- Workplaces: University of Oxford; University of California, Berkeley
- Thesis: Nuclear Magnetic Resonance Data-Processing Methods
- Doctoral advisor: Peter J. Hore
- Website: nmr.physics.ox.ac.uk; users.ox.ac.uk/~jajones/

Jonathan A. Jones (born 1967) is a professor in atomic and laser physics at the University of Oxford, and a fellow and tutor in physics at Brasenose College, Oxford.

== Education ==
Jones studied at Corpus Christi College, Oxford, from 1985 to 1989 and St John's College, Oxford, from 1989 to 1992. He received his Doctor of Philosophy degree in 1992 for research on Nuclear magnetic resonance data processing methods supervised by Peter Hore.

== Research and career ==
Although trained in chemistry, he is active in physics, especially for his work on NMR quantum computation for which he was awarded the 2000 Marlow Medal of the Royal Society of Chemistry. His main research interest is in quantum computation.

== Freedom of information activism ==
In 2009, Jones joined in making Freedom of Information requests to the Climatic Research Unit following a complaint by blogger Steve McIntyre that the Climatic Research Unit of the University of East Anglia (UEA) had refused to release raw weather station data. Meteorological organisations had allowed the university to use this data on the understanding that it would be kept private, largely due to its commercial value. Jones made a Freedom of Information request for raw data which the university had shared with another researcher, but refused to provide to McIntyre. The university worked with the Met Office to get meteorological organisations to waive confidentiality on raw instrumental data, most failed to respond and two refused. In 2011 the Information Commissioner's Office decided that the university had to make the data public, regardless of the wishes of its owners. Jones said to BBC News that it was a matter of principle, "This dataset wasn't particularly interesting, but we thought the data in general should be available, and we thought people shouldn't have to make FoI requests for it." The decision was described as a "landmark ruling" and a "victory for critics of the UEA" by Fred Pearce of The Guardian. Jones said "My sole aim [in pursuing the case] is to help restore climate science to something more closely resembling scientific norms".
