= Global Historical Climatology Network =

Database of temperature, precipitation and pressure records

The Global Historical Climatology Network (GHCN) is a data set of temperature, precipitation and pressure records managed by the National Climatic Data Center (NCDC), Arizona State University and the Carbon Dioxide Information Analysis Center. Since 2015 the CHCN is being managed by the National Centers for Environmental Information (NCEI).

The aggregate data are collected from many continuously reporting fixed stations at the Earth's surface. In 2012, there were 25,000 stations within 180 countries and territories. Some examples of monitoring variables are the total daily precipitation and maximum and minimum temperature. A caveat to this is 66% of the stations report only the daily precipitation.

The original idea for the application of the GHCN-M data was to provide climatic analysis for data sets that require daily monitoring. Its purpose is to create a global base-line data set that can be compiled from stations worldwide.

This work has often been used as a foundation for reconstructing past global temperatures, and was used in previous versions of two of the best-known reconstructions, that prepared by the NCDC, and that prepared by NASA as its Goddard Institute for Space Studies (GISS) temperature set. The average temperature record is 60 years long with ~1650 records greater than 100 years and ~220 greater than 150 years (based on GHCN v2 in 2006). The earliest data included in the database were collected in 1697.

== History ==
The initial version of Global Historical Climatology Network was developed in the summer of 1992. This first version, known as Version 1 was a collaboration between research stations and data sets alike to the World Weather Records program and the World Monthly Surface Station Climatology from the National Center for Atmospheric Research. Within the stations, all of them have at least 10 years of data, 2/5 have more than 50 years of data, and 1/10 have 100 years of data. Version 1, or more commonly notated as V1 was the collection of monthly mean temperatures from 6,000 stations. There were, as of 2022, 3 subsequent versions of the GHCN – M have been created as described below.

== Map and description ==
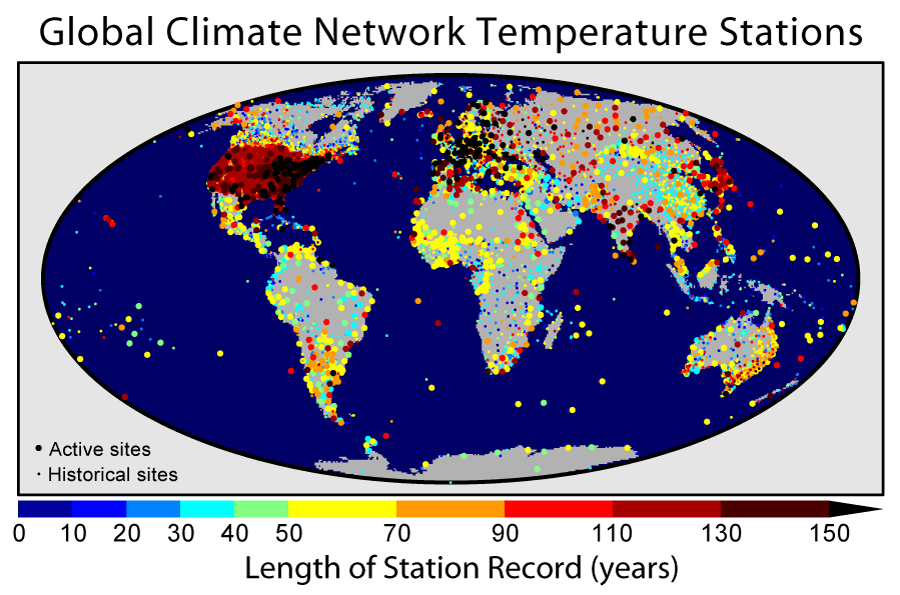
Map of temperature station locations with record lengths indicated by coloring as on GHCN version 3 in 2007.

The GHCN is one of the primary reference compilations of temperature data used for climatology, and is the foundation of the GISTEMP Temperature Record. This map based on GHCN version 3 shows 7,280 fixed temperature stations in the GHCN catalog color-coded by the length of the available record as of 2007. Sites that are actively updated in the database (2,277) are marked as "active" and shown in large symbols, other sites are marked as "historical" and shown in small symbols. In some cases, the "historical" sites are still collecting data but due to reporting and data processing delays (of more than a decade in some cases) they do not contribute to current temperature estimates.

After this map was created, version 4 of GHCN was released and increased the number of reported stations to over 24,000.

=== Advantages ===
These are direct, in-situ measurements which were not interpolated or based on model simulations. This image shows 3,832 records longer than 50 years, 1,656 records longer than 100 years, and 226 records longer than 150 years. The longest record in the collection began in Berlin in 1701 and is still collected in the present day.

=== Disadvantages ===
As is evident from this plot, the most densely instrumented portion of the globe is in the United States, while Antarctica is the most sparsely instrumented land area. Many parts of Africa do not have current temperature data. Records are mostly limited to places where human settlements exist. Parts of the Pacific and other oceans are more isolated from fixed temperature stations, but this is supplemented by volunteer observing ships that record temperature information during their normal travels. The recorded data may also be subject to inhomogeneities, such as station relocation, change in observation practice (e.g. from staffed observation to automatic datalogger) and change in instruments.

=== GHCN – M Version Evolution ===
While V1 was the prominent collection of climate data throughout the 1990s, its flaws were slowly appearing and was soon replaced by Version 2 (V2). V2 was released in 1997, swiftly replacing the newly outdated V1. The improvements included improved world coverage; number of stations increased from 6,000 to 7280 as well as creating new data processing enhancements. These include but are not limited to increase in updated data, increased quality assurance, and additional data sets. V2 quickly became the frontrunner for organizations like NASA, NOAA, and IPCC. The GHCN – M V2 was the predominant climate monitoring data set for 14 years. Until in 2011, Version 3 (V3) was released. Version 3 was a new and improved version of the two previous versions with additional quality controls. These controls included eliminating duplicate data collections and minimizing homogenization. The newest version and the one being currently used is known as V4, or Version 4. V4 is currently made up of 25,000 land-based stations which has become one of the largest collectors of monthly and daily climate data around the world. The goal of V4 was to combine the previous data sets collected with ones currently being recorded to create an overarching view of the changing climate data. This also helped eliminate the previously unsolved issue of homogenization which plagued the previous versions. Additionally, V4 accounted for previously large issues, such as uncertainties, differences in scale, as well as the aforementioned homogenization.
