= HadCRUT =

Global Temperature Record

HadCRUT is the dataset of worldwide monthly instrumental temperature records formed by combining the sea surface temperature records compiled by the Hadley Centre of the UK Met Office and the land surface air temperature records compiled by the Climatic Research Unit (CRU) of the University of East Anglia.

"HadCRUT" stands for Hadley Centre/Climatic Research Unit Temperature.

The data is provided on a grid of boxes covering the globe, with values provided for only those boxes containing temperature observations in a particular month and year. Interpolation is not applied to infill missing values. The first version of HadCRUT initially spanned the period 1881–1993, and this was later extended to begin in 1850 and to be regularly updated to the current year/month in near real-time.

== HadCRUT4 ==
HadCRUT4 was introduced in March 2012. It "includes the addition of newly digitised measurement data, both over land and sea, new sea-surface temperature bias adjustments and a more comprehensive error model for describing uncertainties in sea-surface temperature measurements". Overall, the net effect of HadCRUT4 versus HadCRUT3 is an increase in the average temperature anomaly, especially around 1950 and 1855, and less significantly around 1925 and 2005.

== HadCRUT3 ==
HadCRUT3 is the third major revision of this dataset, combining the CRUTEM3 land surface air temperature dataset with the HadSST2 sea surface temperature dataset. First published in 2006, this initially spanned the period 1850–2005, but has since been regularly updated to 2012. Its spatial grid boxes are 5° of latitude and longitude. A more complete statistical model of uncertainty was introduced with this revision, including estimates of measurements errors, biases due to changing exposure and urbanisation, and uncertainty due to incomplete coverage of the globe by observations of temperature.

== HadCRUT2 ==
HadCRUT2 was the second major version of this dataset, combining the CRUTEM2 land surface air temperature dataset with the HadSST sea surface temperature dataset. First published in 2003, this initially spanned the period 1856–2001, but was subsequently updated to end in 2005. Its spatial grid boxes are 5° of latitude and longitude. An estimate of uncertainty due to incomplete coverage of the globe by observations of temperature was included, as was a version with the variance adjusted to remove artificial changes arising from changing numbers of observations.

== HadCRUT1 ==
HadCRUT1 was the first version of this dataset. Although not initially referred to as HadCRUT1, this name was introduced later to distinguish it from subsequent versions. First published in 1994, this initially spanned the period 1881–1993, but was subsequently extended to span 1856–2002. HadCRUT1 at first combined two sea surface temperature datasets (MOHSST for 1881–1981 and GISST for 1981–1993) with an earlier land surface air temperature dataset from the Climatic Research Unit. The land surface air temperature dataset was replaced in 1995 with the newly published CRUTEM1 dataset. Its spatial grid boxes are 5° of latitude and longitude.

== History of CRU Climate Data ==
The Climatic Research Unit had as an early priority the objective of filling gaps in available information "to establish the past record of climate over as much of the world as possible, as far back in time as was feasible, and in enough detail to recognise and establish the basic processes, interactions, and evolutions in the Earth's fluid envelopes and those involving the Earth's crust and its vegetation cover". Through the 1970s the unit worked on interpreting documentary historical records. From 1978 onward CRU began production of its gridded data set of land air temperature anomalies based on instrumental temperature records held by National Meteorological Organisations around the world. In 1986 sea temperatures were added to form a synthesis of data which was the first global temperature record, demonstrating unequivocally that the globe has warmed by almost 0.8 °C over the last 157 years. From 1989 this work proceeded in conjunction with the Met Office Hadley Centre for Climate Prediction and Research, and their work demonstrated global warming of almost 0.8 °C over the last 157 years.

Access to weather station temperature records was often under formal or informal confidentiality agreements that restricted use of this raw data to academic purposes. From the 1990s onwards the unit received requests for this weather station temperature data from people who hoped to independently verify the impact of various adjustments, and after the UK Freedom of Information Act (FOIA) came into effect in 2005, there were Freedom of Information requests to the Climatic Research Unit for this raw data. On 12 August 2009 CRU announced that they were seeking permission to waive these restrictions, and on 24 November 2009 the university stated that over 95% of the CRU weather station temperature data set had already been available for several years, with the remainder to be released when permissions were obtained. In a decision announced on 27 July 2011 the Information Commissioner's Office (ICO) required release of raw data even though permissions had not been obtained or in one instance had been refused, and on 27 July 2011 CRU announced release of the raw temperature data not already in the public domain, with the exception of Poland which was outside the area covered by the FOIA request.

== See also ==
- Climatic Research Unit
