= Premiership of John Swinney =

Scottish governance since 2024

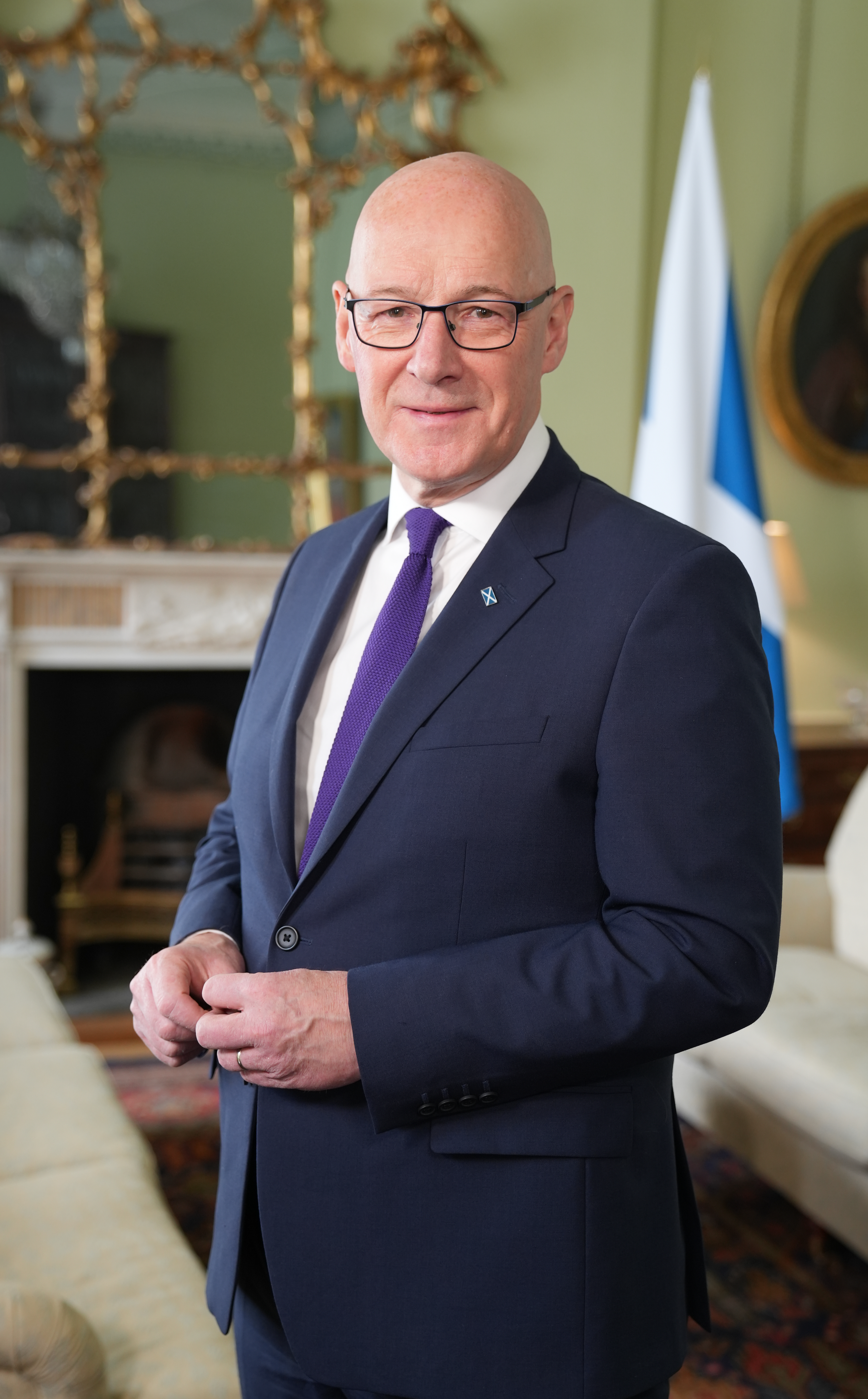
- Official portrait, 2026
- Premiership of John Swinney; 8 May 2024 – present
- Monarch: Charles III
- Cabinet: First Swinney government Second Swinney government
- Party: Scottish National Party
- Election: 2026
- Seat: Bute House

John Swinney's term as First Minister of Scotland began on 8 May 2024, when he was formally sworn into office at the Court of Session, upon Humza Yousaf's resignation. His premiership has been defined by a focus on "people's priorities," specifically eradicating child poverty, growing the economy, improving public services, and tackling the climate emergency, as well as pushing for a second independence referendum.

Swinney previously served as leader of the Scottish National Party (SNP) from 2000 to 2004, when the party was in opposition. Yousaf announced his resignation as party leader and first minister on 29 April 2024, amid a government crisis. Swinney announced his leadership bid on 2 May, but faced potential leadership challenges from Kate Forbes and Graeme McCormick. Both candidates eventually decided not to stand and endorsed Swinney, who was therefore elected unopposed as the SNP party leader on 6 May; Swinney subsequently appointed Forbes as Deputy First Minister.

His early premiership was marked by the loss of 39 seats at the 2024 United Kingdom general election in Scotland, reducing the SNP to the second-largest party in Scotland and the fourth-largest party in the Westminster Parliament. However, the SNP have since recovered in the polls amid the unpopularity of both Prime Minister Keir Starmer and Scottish Labour Leader Anas Sarwar.

Domestically, Swinney's term has been marked by declaring a national housing emergency, navigating the closure of the Grangemouth Refinery, and handling the widespread infrastructure damage caused by Storm Éowyn in early 2025, as well as the government response to the Queen Elizabeth University Hospital infections scandal, denying that there had been any political pressure to open the hospital before it was ready. Internationally, Swinney met with Donald Trump to discuss whisky tariffs following the Liberation Day tariffs. Swinney has called for an immediate ceasefire in the Gaza war, and for a de-escalation of the conflict between Iran and Israel, citing "potential dangers of the military intervention".

Swinney led his party into the 2026 Scottish Parliament election, and has promised to deliver independence after his re-election. While the constitutional debate around independence has remained central to Scottish discourse during Swinney's premiership, the immediate path to a second referendum remains stalled by legal and political obstacles.

== Background ==
Following the 2021 Scottish Parliament election, the SNP had been in a power-sharing agreement with the Scottish Greens. In April 2024, Yousaf terminated the agreement, following changes to landmark climate policy by Màiri McAllan, Cabinet Secretary for Wellbeing Economy, Net Zero and Energy. Patrick Harvie and Lorna Slater, co-leaders of the Greens, announced they would support a no confidence motion in Yousaf. Amid the crisis, Yousaf announced his resignation as party leader and first minister on 29 April.

== Leadership election ==
On 2 May, Swinney launched his leadership bid, after Kate Forbes, who was a serious contender to become leader, declined to stand and endorsed him.

Graeme McCormick announced he would challenge Swinney for the leadership, saying he had the 100 nominations on 5 May. Just hours later, he withdrew and endorsed Swinney, becoming the presumptive nominee.

On 6 May, with no other candidates put forward, Swinney was elected as party leader unopposed.

== First term (2024–2026) ==
=== Government formation ===
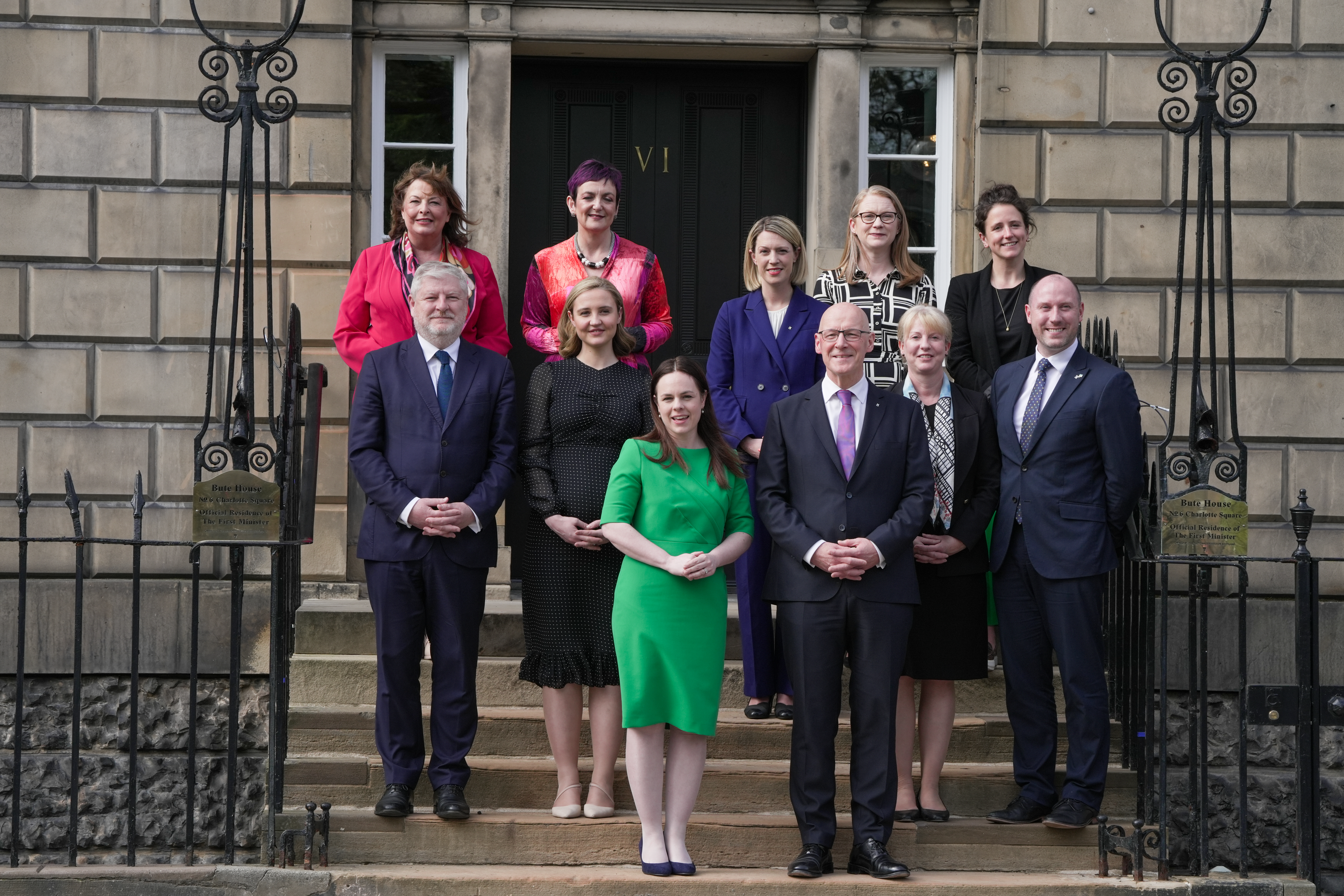
Swinney's cabinet, pictured at Bute House on 8 May 2024.

Swinney was officially sworn into office as First Minister of Scotland on 8 May 2024 at the Court of Session in Edinburgh after receiving the Royal Warrant of Appointment by King Charles III.

The majority of Swinney's cabinet were previously part of Humza Yousaf's previous governments. The only addition to the cabinet was Kate Forbes replacing Shona Robison as Deputy First Minister of Scotland, and taking part of Màiri McAllan's responsibility for economy into her portfolio as Cabinet Secretary for Economy and Gaelic. Robison was, however, re-appointed by Swinney as Finance Secretary with additional responsibility for local government, with McAllan appointed as the reduced portfolio of Cabinet Secretary for Net Zero and Energy.

Swinney's cabinet met for the first time on 10 May 2024, with the Permanent Secretary to the Scottish Government John-Paul Marks and the Lord Advocate Dorothy Bain also attending the cabinet meeting. Speaking about the first meeting of his cabinet since becoming First Minister, Swinney said "today, my colleagues and I embark on a new chapter as we collectively work to build a better, brighter future for the people of Scotland. It is my greatest honour to lead us forward on that journey – one that will drive economic growth, tackle the climate crisis and eradicate the scourge of child poverty in our country once and for all".

=== Debut First Ministers Questions ===
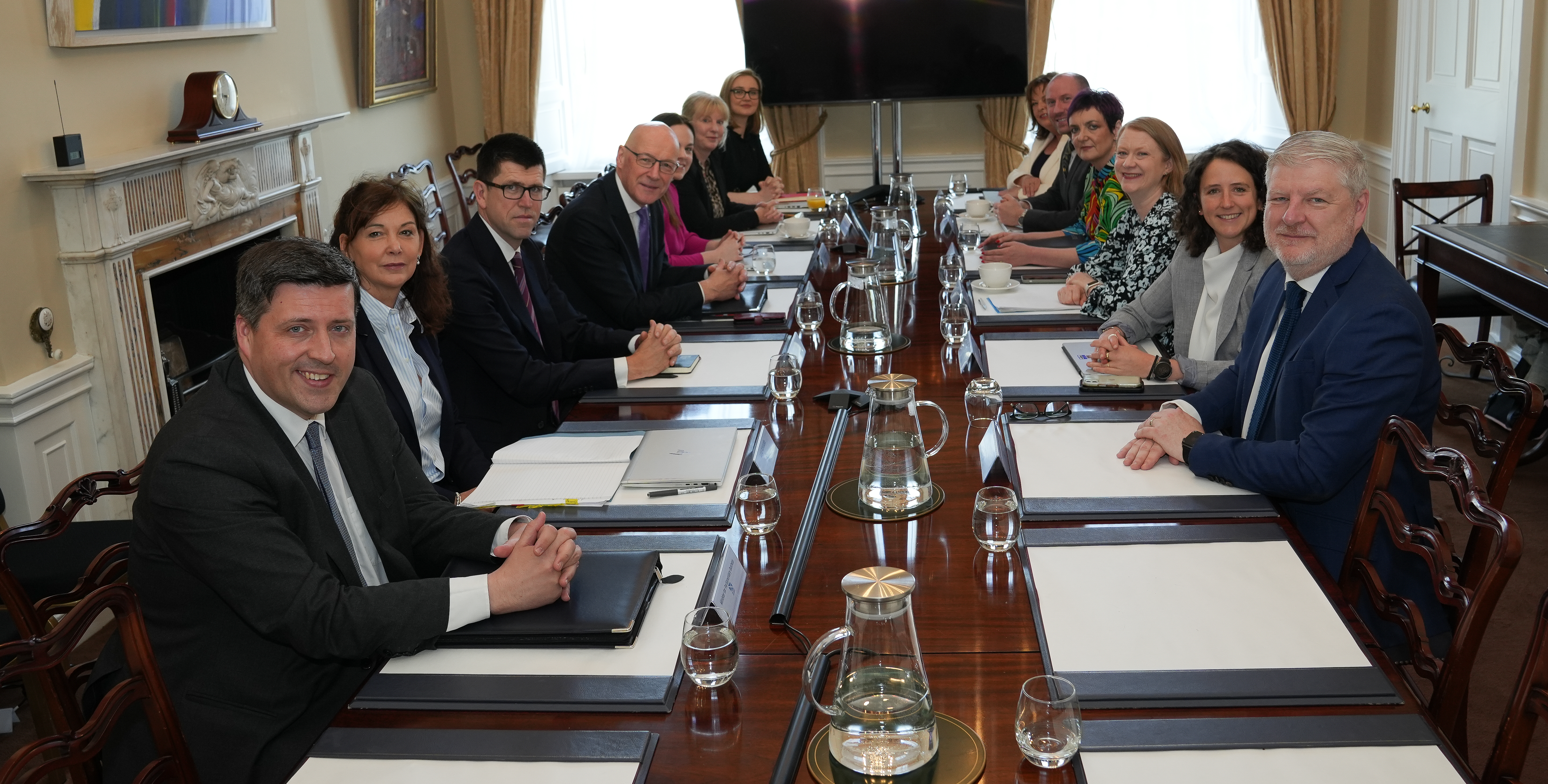
The first meeting of the Swinney government, 10 May 2024

Swinney's first First Minister's Questions in the Scottish Parliament as First Minister occurred on Thursday 9 May 2024, during which Swinney's record on education during his tenure as education secretary under former First Minister Nicola Sturgeon was attacked by both Anas Sarwar (leader, Scottish Labour Party) and Douglas Ross (leader, Scottish Conservative and Unionist Party). Ross asked if Swinney would "recommit to increasing teacher numbers by 3,500", whilst Sarwar asked Swinney if he "could save 450 Glasgow teachers whose jobs are under threat". Swinney confirmed to the Scottish Parliament chamber that, as First Minister, he would work with local councils to "deliver on education".

His decision to appoint Kate Forbes as the Deputy First Minister was criticised by Patrick Harvie, the co–leader of the Scottish Greens, who asked if the SNP was going back to "the repressive values of 1950s with the return of Kate Forbes to the cabinet". Swinney was dismissive of the claims made by Harvie and defended his decision on appointing Forbes as Deputy First Minister, claiming that Forbes "had delivered progressive taxation when she was finance secretary".

=== First actions ===
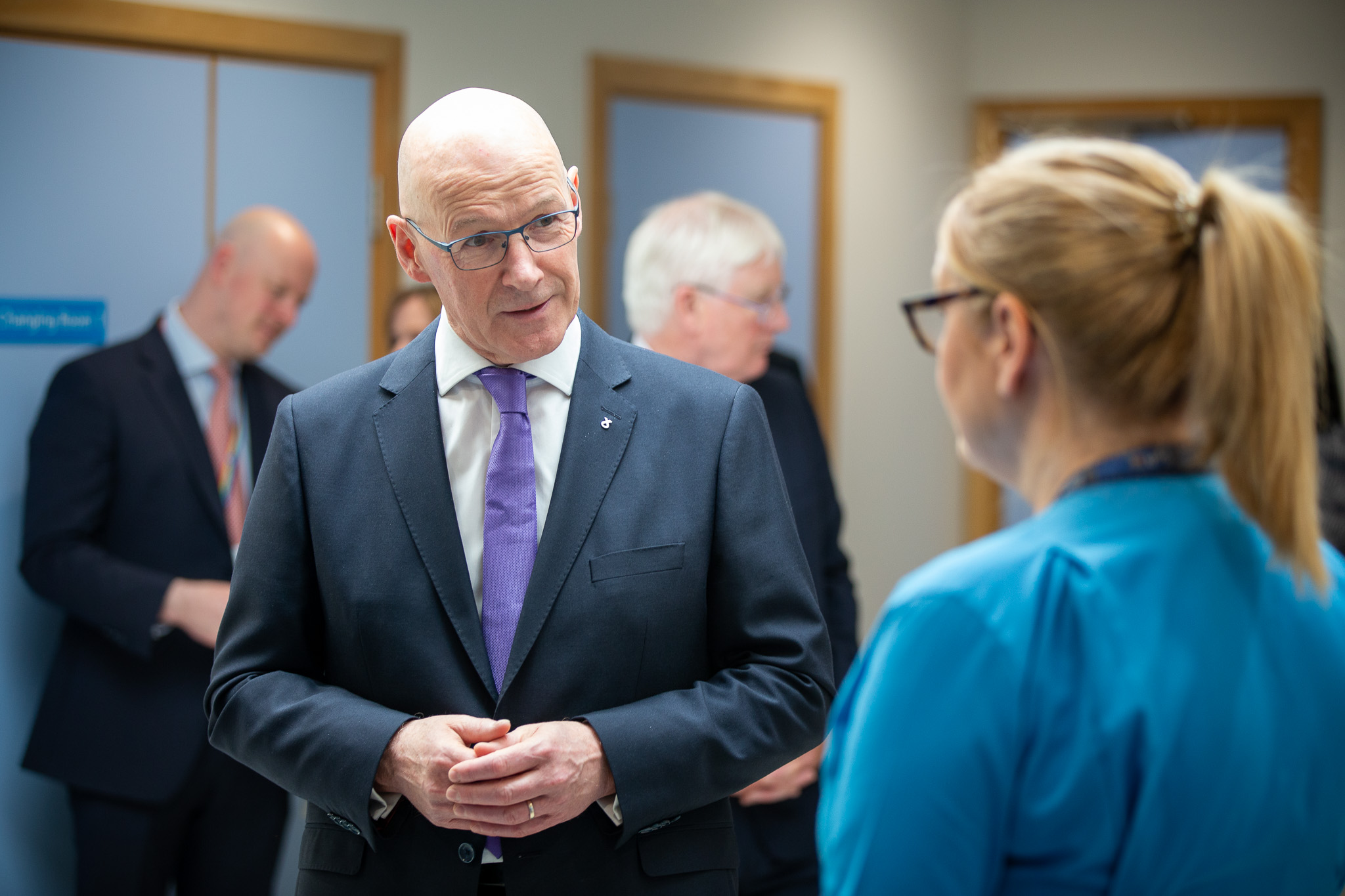
Swinney visits St John's Hospital, May 2024

Upon becoming First Minister, Swinney addressed issues within NHS Scotland, the country's national health service. He recognised that the NHS in Scotland is "operating under sustained pressure", further adding that " I am absolutely committed to working with health boards to improve standards – starting with our recent £30 million investment to drive down waiting times". Additionally, Swinney also pledged support to infrastructure projects across Scotland, stating that the Scottish Government "will also build on our investment and track record on major infrastructure projects. I'm pleased to also be able to visit one example of that record being the Levenmouth Rail Link, a line which will reconnect local communities for the first time in 50 years, and make a real contribution to the Government's net-zero transport ambitions. I pledge that I will stand with Scotland's businesses, large and small, and do whatever I can to help them to grow, innovate, and boost our economy for the benefit of those who live here".

Swinney's early premiership was marked by the resolution of the Michael Matheson iPad scandal: the SNP MSP Michael Matheson had incurred a £11,000 bill after taking a Parliamentary iPad while on a family holiday, and had attempted to claim the bill back on expenses before admitting that the iPad had not been used for work purposes. Swinney refused to support the Standards, Procedures and Public Appointments Committee's proposed sanction on Matheson, describing Matheson as a "friend and colleague" who had "made mistakes", and casting doubt on the integrity of the committee's process: describing the process as "prejudiced", Swinney claimed that Conservative MSP Annie Wells should have removed herself from the committee due to previous comments about Matheson's conduct. Swinney's support for Matheson was described as "incredible and indefensible" by the Scottish Conservatives leader Douglas Ross, and "unbelievable and embarrassing" by the Scottish Labour leader Anas Sarwar. Swinney directed the SNP to abstain on the parliamentary vote on the committee's recommendations, after introducing an amendment re-iterating Swinney's complaints about the investigation into Matheson. The Scottish Parliament subsequently voted in support of the committee's proposed sanction, banning Matheson from the Scottish Parliament for 27 days and withholding his salary 54 days, the heaviest sanction ever awarded to an MSP.

=== Housing crisis ===
In May 2024, Swinney declared a national housing crisis across Scotland following pressure in the Scottish Parliament from the Scottish Labour Party who brought forward a motion in the parliamentary chamber on the issue. Up until the declaration of a housing crisis, homelessness in Scotland had been rising significantly, with five local authorities including City of Edinburgh Council and City of Glasgow Council urging the Scottish Government to immediately intervene. It was estimated that around 15,000 people in Scotland were reported to be living in temporary housing accommodation, including an estimated 10,000 children across the country.

Swinney argued that "bringing back empty homes into use is key to tackling the newly declared housing emergency", further commenting that "the housing supply has to be developed and new investment has to be found to ensure more new homes are built". The decision to declare a housing emergency by the Scottish Government was widely welcomed by homelinesses charities across Scotland.

=== Programme for government ===
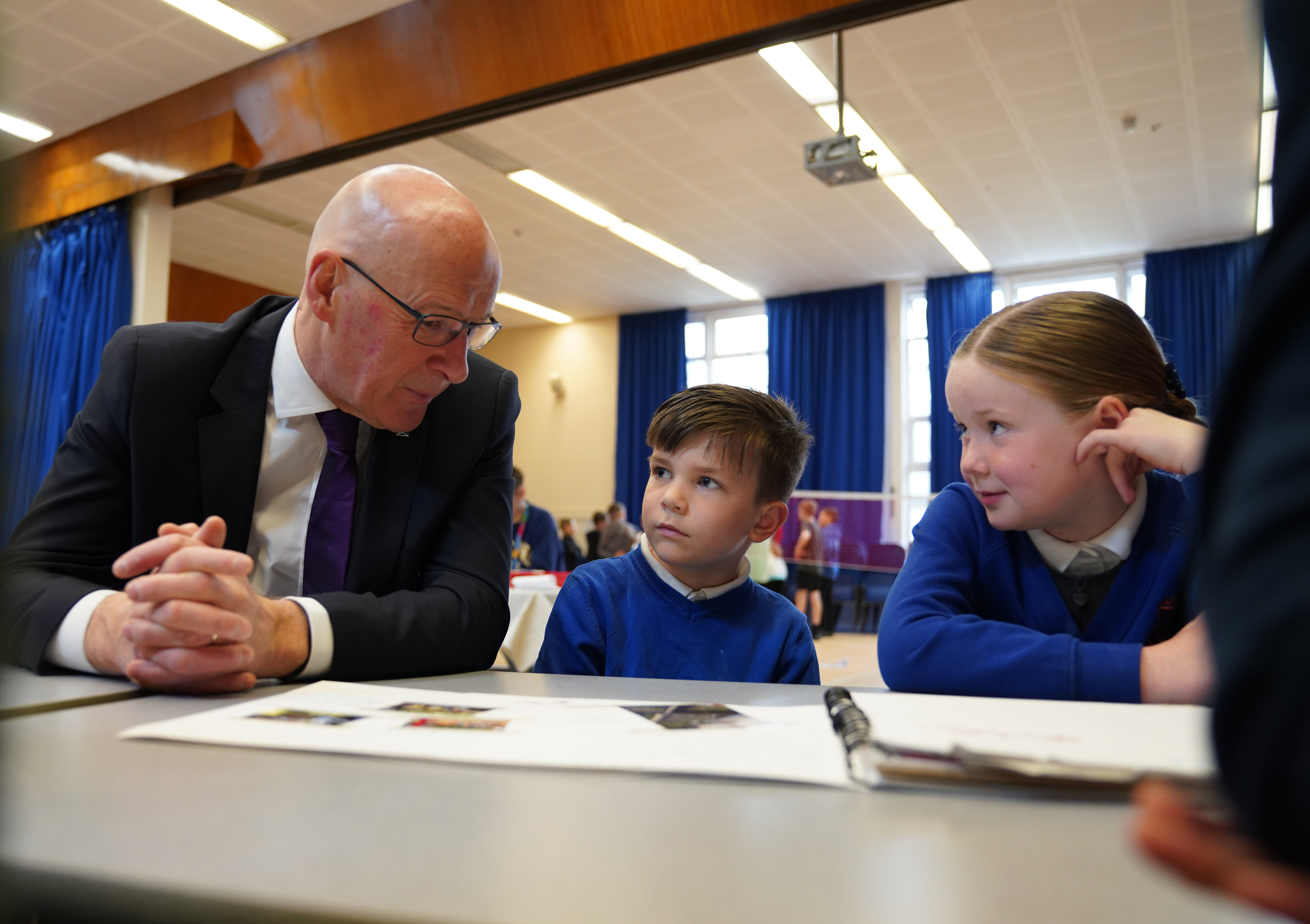
Swinney visits Capshard Primary School on the day he announced his programme for government, 22 May 2024

On 22 May 2024, Swinney outlined his programme for government as First Minister. In a speech to the Scottish Parliament, Swinney identified four priorities for Scotland including eradicating child poverty, growing the economy, tackling the climate emergency and improving public services. During his speech, Swinney highlighted "the economic and fiscal realities we face", but advocated that the priorities for the government will "guide my government's decisions on policy and budget", further claiming that "the four priorities around which I will work to secure cross-party support is for the good of the people of Scotland". Overall, Swinney argued that the programme for government's priorities are essential, stating that "eradicating child poverty, growing the economy and tackling the climate emergency all link together to support my fourth key priority – to improve Scotland's public services – not as a cost, but as a vital investment in our future health, equality and prosperity". Subject to the Scottish Parliamentary timetable, the date for Programme for Government will be confirmed in due course.

Swinney's Programme for Government was formally announced on 4 September 2024, aiming to deliver on eradicating child poverty, growing the Scottish economy, tackling the climate emergency and improving public services across Scotland. Swinney proposed that during 2024–2025, Scottish Parliament bills will be introduced in areas such as Adults with Incapacity, the Scottish Budget, Building Safety Levy, Climate Change (Emissions Reduction Targets), Community Wealth Building, Criminal Justice Modernisation and Abusive Domestic Behaviour Reviews, Crofting, Leases (such as automatic continuation), Heat in Buildings, Misogyny, Natural Environment, Post-School Education Reform, Prisoners and Scotland's co–hosting of the UEFA Euro 2028 football tournament.

==== Economy ====
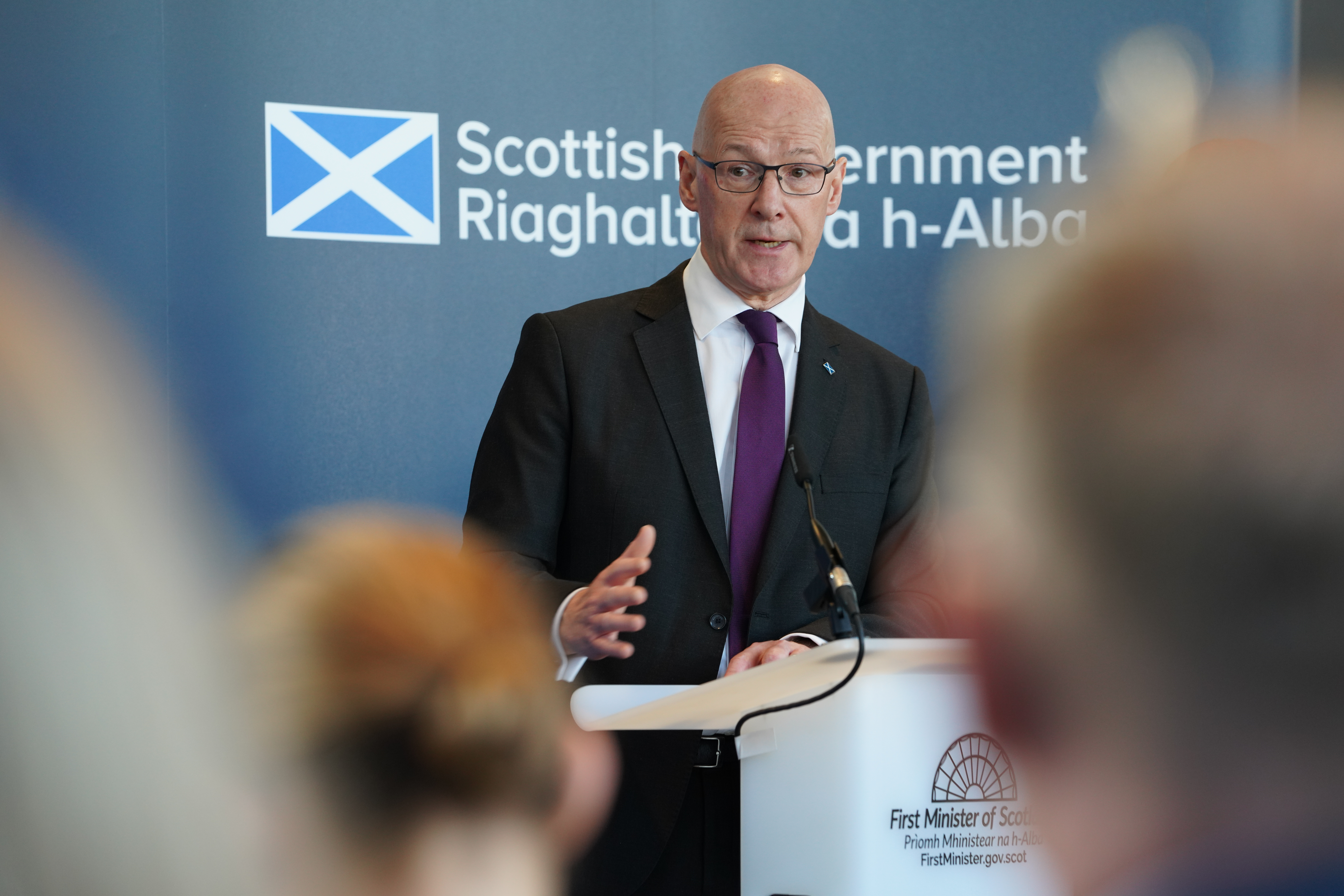
Swinney delivering a speech on the economy at the Edinburgh Futures Institute, October 2024

Since 2007, the Gross Domestic Product (GDP) per person in Scotland has risen by 11% compared to 6% in the rest of the United Kingdom, with Swinney advocating to build on this by spearheading a more inclusive economy by combating inequalities faced by women and minority groups, increasing investment and exports, promoting Scottish businesses and entrepreneurs, supporting business and encouraging more people into work. Swinney pledged to publish a Green Industrial Strategy to outline the Scottish Government's plans towards a more net zero based economy and to establish internationally competitive clusters. The Scottish Government recognises five internationally competitive clusters including onshore and offshore wind, carbon capture utilisation, storage, professional and financial services, together with hydrogen and clean industries. Swinney announced plans as part of his programme for government to attract more investment to Scotland by creating jobs, supporting innovation and attracting additional investment through the Scottish National Investment Bank, implementing a programme to attract investment in net zero, housing and infrastructure, and a national project pipeline of investment in 2025.

During a speech to the Edinburgh Futures Institute in October 2024, Swinney acknowledged the "significance of the moment we find ourselves in", claiming that the forthcoming UK Budget statement was "a make-or-break moment". Swinney stressed that the public finances were "a grave challenge" and something in which he had not seen before whilst serving in government, but advocated for an investment to grow the economy. During the speech, Swinney argued that investment in the economy "will allow us to move into an economic spring, with new growth, new opportunities, and new hope", whilst advocating for an all four nations approach towards being able to become "investing governments".

==== Child poverty ====
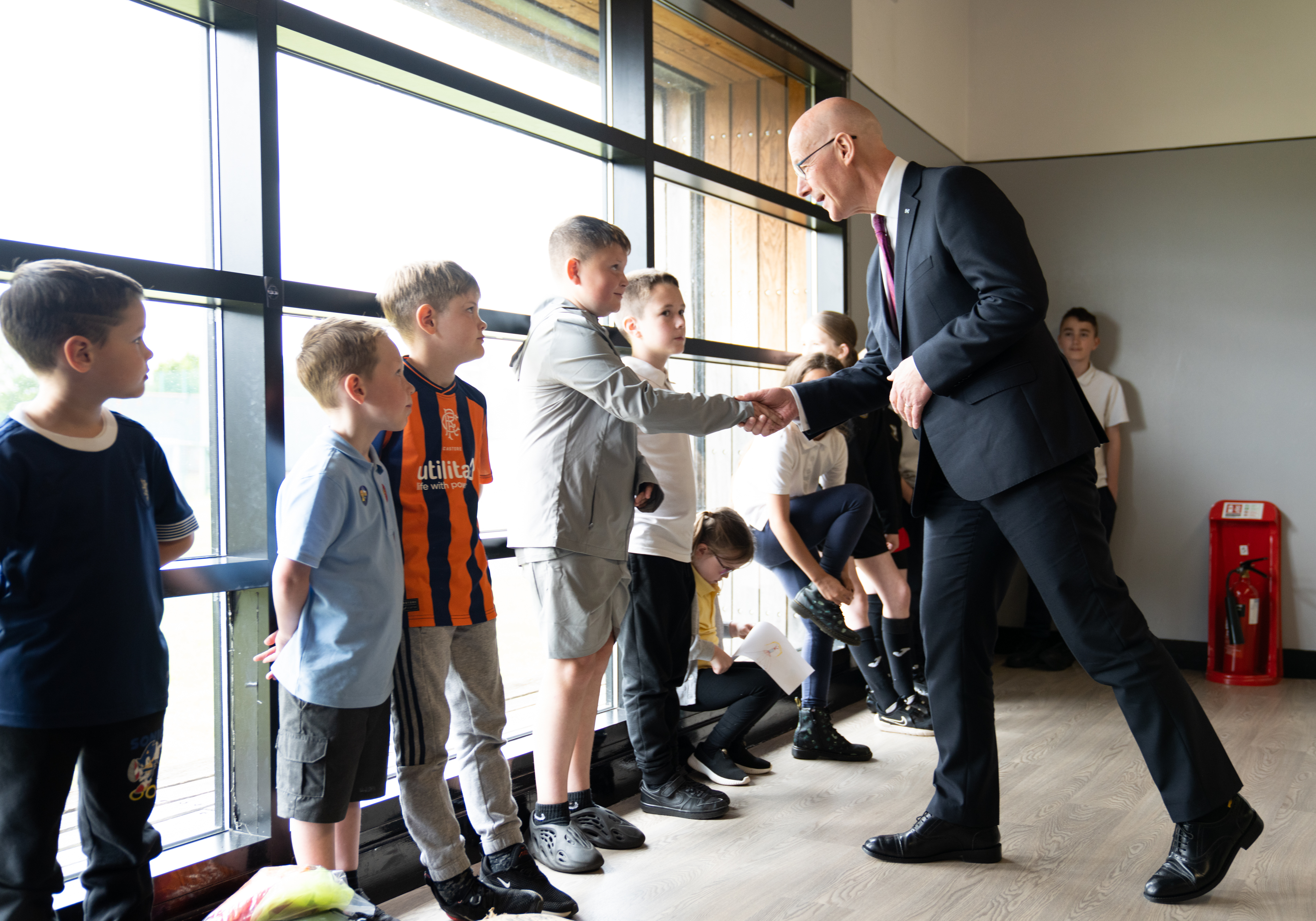
Swinney announces extra funding for activity clubs to help families on low incomes with childcare, June 2024

One of the four priorities of government under Swinney is the eradication of child poverty in Scotland. On the same day he announced his government's priorities for government, Swinney pledged £16 million in invest in childcare across Scotland over the next two years. Scottish Government ministers have a statutory requirement to "cut the number of children living in households in relative poverty to below 10% by 2030", with an estimated 240,000 children (24%) living in relative poverty following the deduction of associated housing costs from 2020–2023.

In June 2024, new measures were introduced by the Scottish Government to reduce child poverty figures. New measures include the Child Poverty Practice Accelerator Fund (CPAF) providing "up to £80,000 per grant towards local projects that test and evaluate new approaches which target at least one of the three drivers of child poverty reduction". The three drivers involved in the reduction of child poverty include improving income from employment, supporting people with the cost of living, and increasing awareness and uptake of social security benefits.

Shirley-Anne Somerville, the Cabinet Secretary for Social Justice in Swinney's government, said "Eradicating child poverty is a central mission for the Scottish Government and we must find new and innovative ways to achieve this". She further added that "the Child Poverty Practice Accelerator Fund will support projects that target the root causes of child poverty and create lasting change in our communities".

==== Climate change ====
Previously billed as the "most ambitious in the world", Scotland ditched its target to reduce climate emissions by 75% by 2030 in April 2024. The Cabinet Secretary for Net Zero in Swinney's government said ministers were "steadfastly" committed to reaching net zero by 2045.

==== Education and criminal justice ====
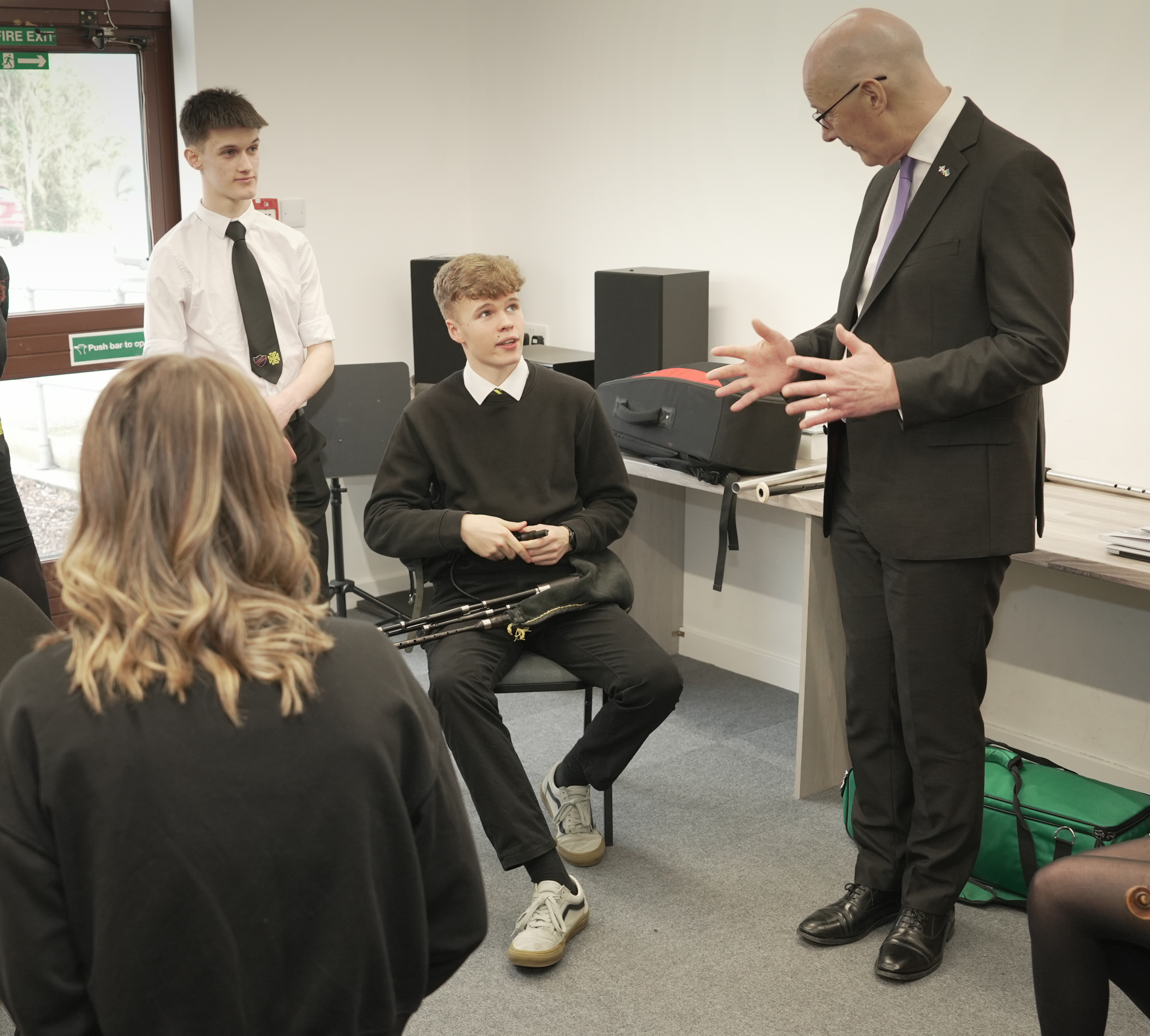
Swinney at the National Centre of Excellence in Traditional Music at Plockton High School, March 2025

As part of his programme for government, Swinney pledged to "work with our local authority partners through the Verity House agreement across a range of policy areas". Through this collaboration, Swinney claims that the Scottish Government intends to continue the improvement of educational performance across Scotland, as well as the delivery of sustainable and affordable social care by reducing the number of delayed discharges across Scotland's hospitals. Additionally, Swinney claimed that his programme for government will "work with partners to improve the efficiency of the criminal justice system to deliver better for victims".

Additionally, Swinney announced further funding of £1 billion each year to support the development of high quality early learning and childcare provision across Scotland. He pledged to complete the nationwide roll out of the Carers Support Payment, an initiative which is designed to help young people with caring responsibilities to be more engaged in full time education. Swinney announced that his government was committed to "tackling economic inactivity and skills shortages", and planned to introduce the Post-School Education Reform Bill to "simplify the post-school funding body landscape". One of the major education policy announcements made by Swinney was the plan to reform national education bodies in order to spearhead improvement, raise standards across Scottish education and to meet the needs of learners across the country.

During his announcement of the programme for government, Swinney confirmed that he and his government would "work with schools" in order to reduce the poverty related attainment gap from his election as first minister until no later than 2026.

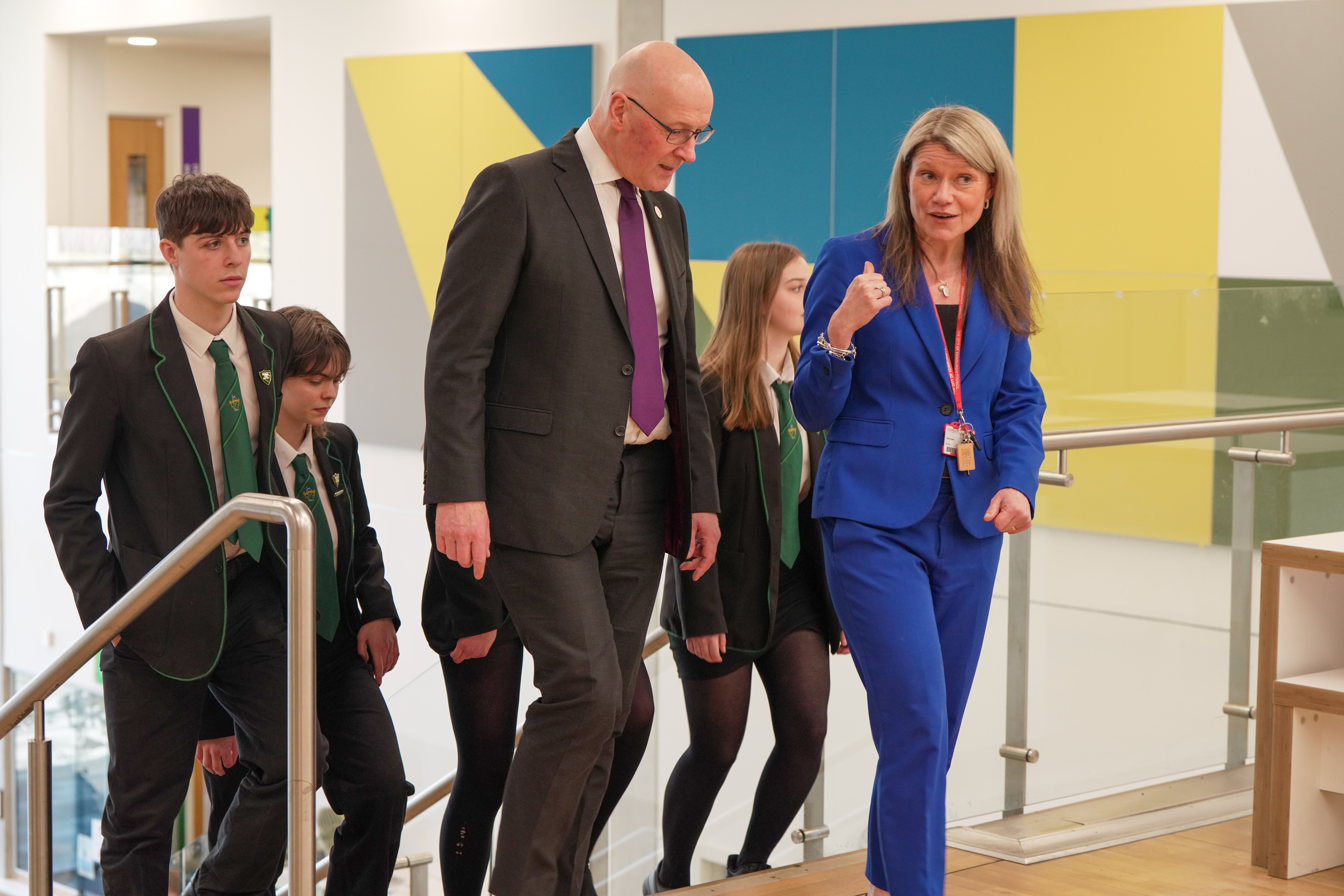
Swinney during a visit to Boroughmuir High School, March 2025

During a session of First Minister's Questions in the Scottish Parliament in December 2024, Swinney was criticised, particularly by the Scottish Conservative and Unionist Party, regarding falling teacher numbers and behaviour in Scottish schools. Scottish Conservative party leader, Russell Findlay, claimed that there had been a "collapse in discipline" across the school network in the country, with the BBC indicating that as many as 45,000 violent incidents had been recorded. Swinney argued that the comments made by Findlay "demean the work of educators in schools" A Scottish Government report which was published in December 2024 confirmed that teacher numbers in Scotland had fallen by 598 between 2023 and 2024. Findlay claimed that pupils and staff across Scottish schools were "being failed" as a result of falling teacher numbers, however, Swinney advised the parliament that teacher numbers "will rise", confirmed that his government would "work with local authorities to bring teacher numbers back to the 2023 level" and expected this work to commence throughout the coming year.

During the same session of First Minister's Questions, leader of the Scottish Labour Party, Anas Sarwar, highlighted the reduction of Additional Support Needs (ASN) teachers in Scotland, highlighting that 40% of Scottish pupils have some form of ASN, but teacher number had decreased under the SNP government. Sarwar claimed that whilst the SNP government had been in charge of the Scottish Government for 17 years "things keep getting worse". In response, Swinney highlighted the “record levels of attainment, literacy and numeracy" in Scottish schools, as well as "new government resources to improve attendance in schools".

=== 2024 UK general election ===
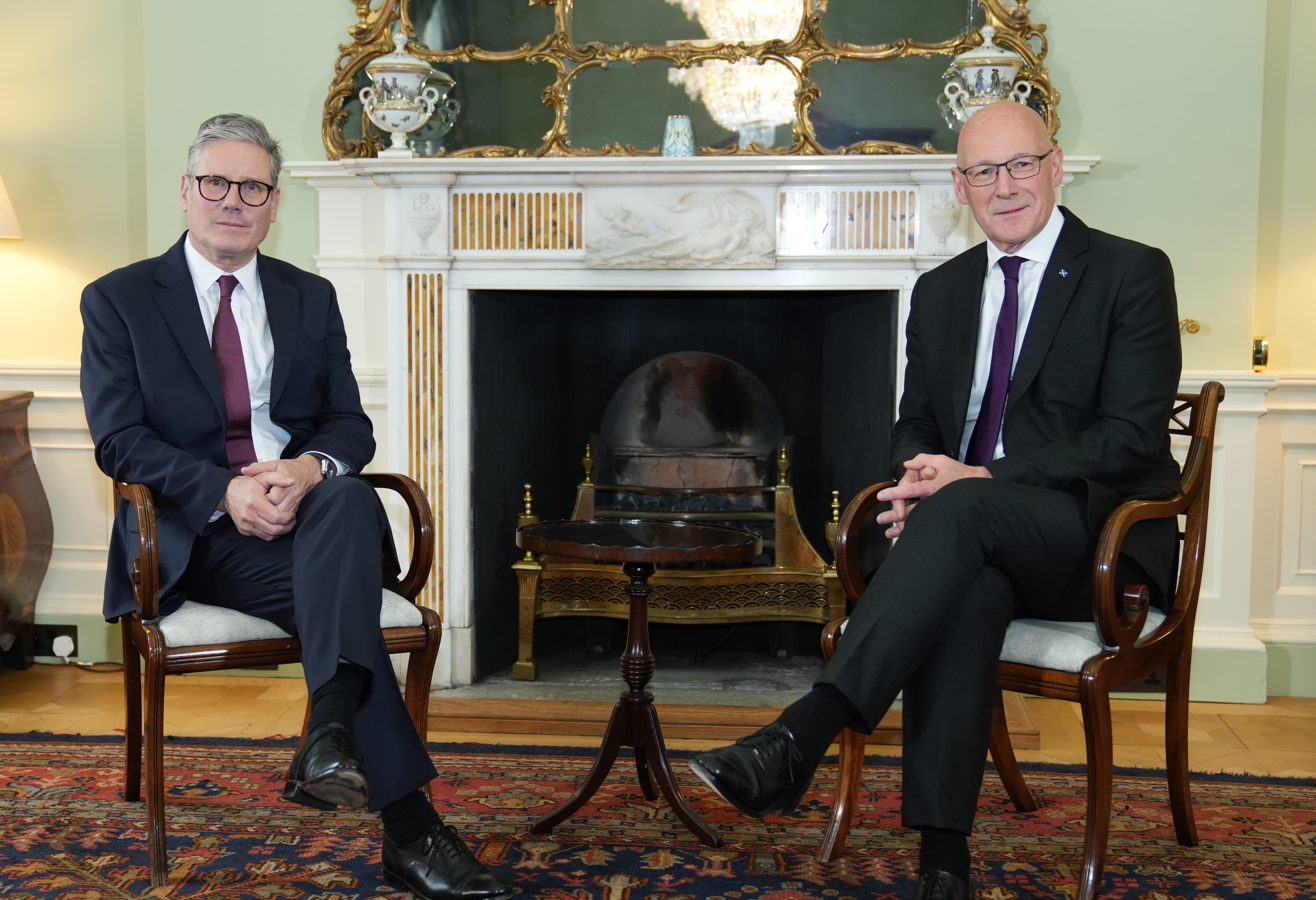
Swinney meets with then-Prime Minister of the United Kingdom, Keir Starmer, following the 2024 election at Bute House

Swinney stated that the decision to hold the 2024 general election on 4 July, when many Scottish schools were on holiday, was "the latest act of disrespect" by the Conservatives towards Scotland. The SNP had previously planned to hold a second independence referendum on 19 October 2023, when many Scottish schools would have been on holiday.

The SNP manifesto for the general election, launched by Swinney in Edinburgh on 19 June, included a "page one, line one" statement; "Vote SNP for Scotland to Become an Independent Country". The manifesto stated that the Scottish Government would be "empowered" to begin negotiations for a second independence referendum if the SNP won a majority of Scottish seats at the general election. Swinney said at the manifesto's launch; "If the SNP wins a majority of seats in this election in Scotland, the Scottish government will embark on negotiations with the UK government to run the democratic wishes of people in Scotland into a reality. The best way to secure independence is through a democratic referendum, the obstacle to that is the intransigence of the United Kingdom government. So what this election gives people the chance to do is to intensify the pressure to secure Scottish independence and to bring that about by voting SNP in order for us to achieve a majority of Westminster seats at this election."

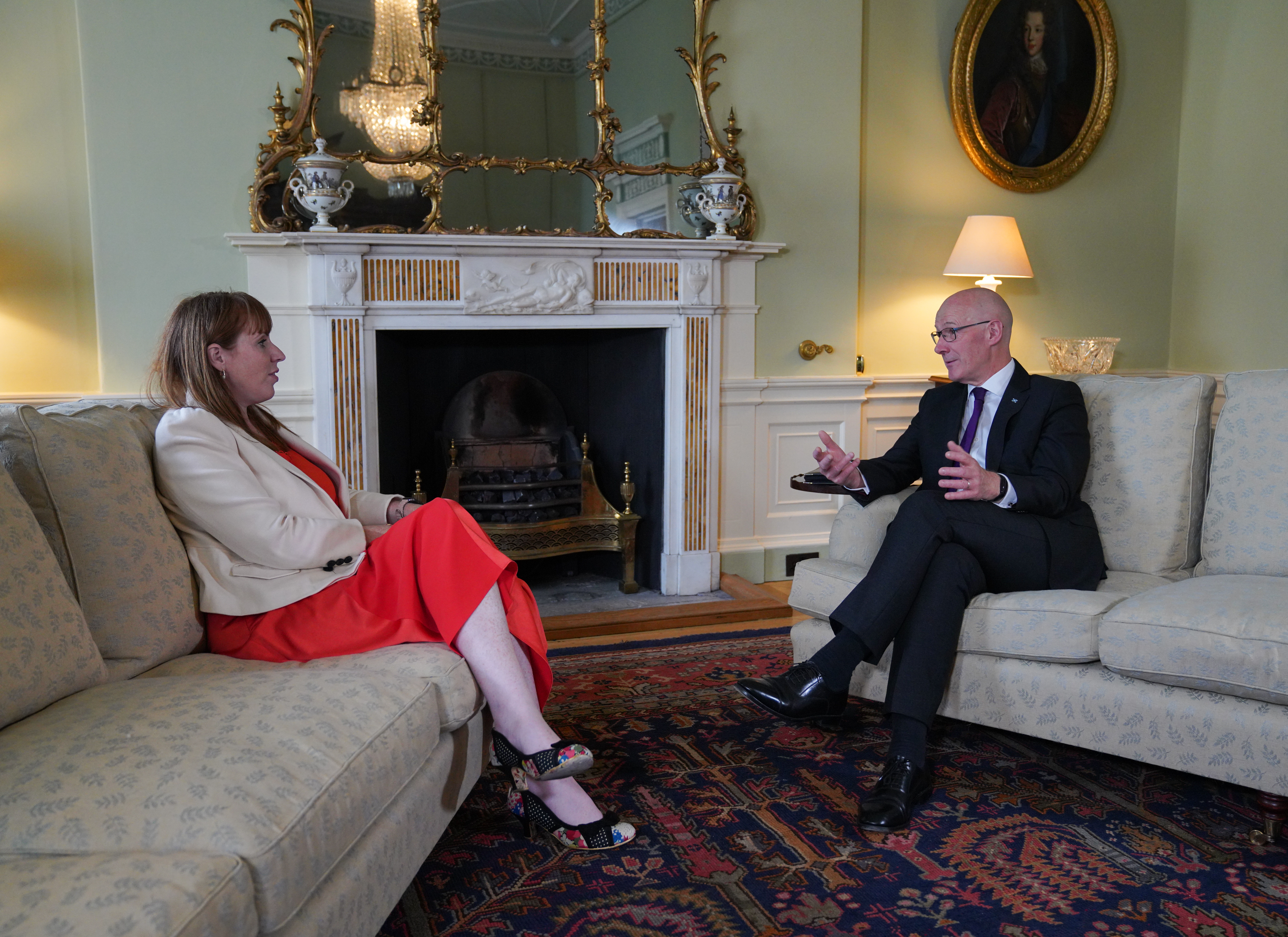
Swinney meets with UK Deputy Prime Minister Angela Rayner at Bute House, August 2024

During the general election campaign, Scottish Parliament officials began an investigation into the SNP following a complaint that stamps bought on parliamentary expenses were passed to Westminster election candidates for campaigning activities. Parliamentary rules state that stationery and postage provided by the Scottish Parliament Corporate Body "must be used only for parliamentary duties and must not be used for any other purpose, including party political purposes". It was reported that Swinney's office manager had told an SNP staff WhatsApp group chat that "stamp fairy is very useful when it comes to campaigns". Swinney stated that he had been "assured that no parliamentary stamps that have been provided by Parliament have been used to support election purposes", and added he was "confident" that there had been no use of any public money to support the SNP general election campaign.

The SNP ultimately won nine seats in the 2024 election, a loss of 38 seats on its 2019 result, reducing it to the second-largest party in Scotland, behind Scottish Labour, and the fourth-largest party in Westminster. Swinney took full responsibility but said that he would not resign as leader. He said of the results, "There will have to be a lot of soul searching as a party as a consequence of these results that have come in tonight", and that the SNP has to be "better at governing on behalf of the people of Scotland", admitting the party was not "winning the argument" on Scottish independence.

=== Net zero economy ===
Swinney introduced a focused strategy to "place Scotland at the forefront of the net zero economy with targeted actions to secure growth and investment". Delivered as part of Swinney's Programme for Government in September 2024, the Green Industrial Strategy sets out five priority areas relating to maximising Scotland’s wind economy, growing the hydrogen sector, developing the carbon capture, utilisation and storage sector, supporting green economy professional and financial services, and attracting clean energy intensive industries such as data centres.

In the same month, the Grangemouth Refinery was earmarked for closure by current owners and operators Petroineos. In response, both the Scottish Government and the UK Government announced a joint plan to secure the industrial future of the plant, despite the plant losing more than $775 million since 2011 on the backdrop of more than $1.2 billion in investment in order to maintain the refinery’s operation. A £100 million support package was announced, including £20 million in joint funding from the Scottish Government and UK Government, with a further £80 million in joint funding from the Scottish Government and UK Government for the Falkirk and Grangemouth Growth Deal.

=== Death of Alex Salmond ===
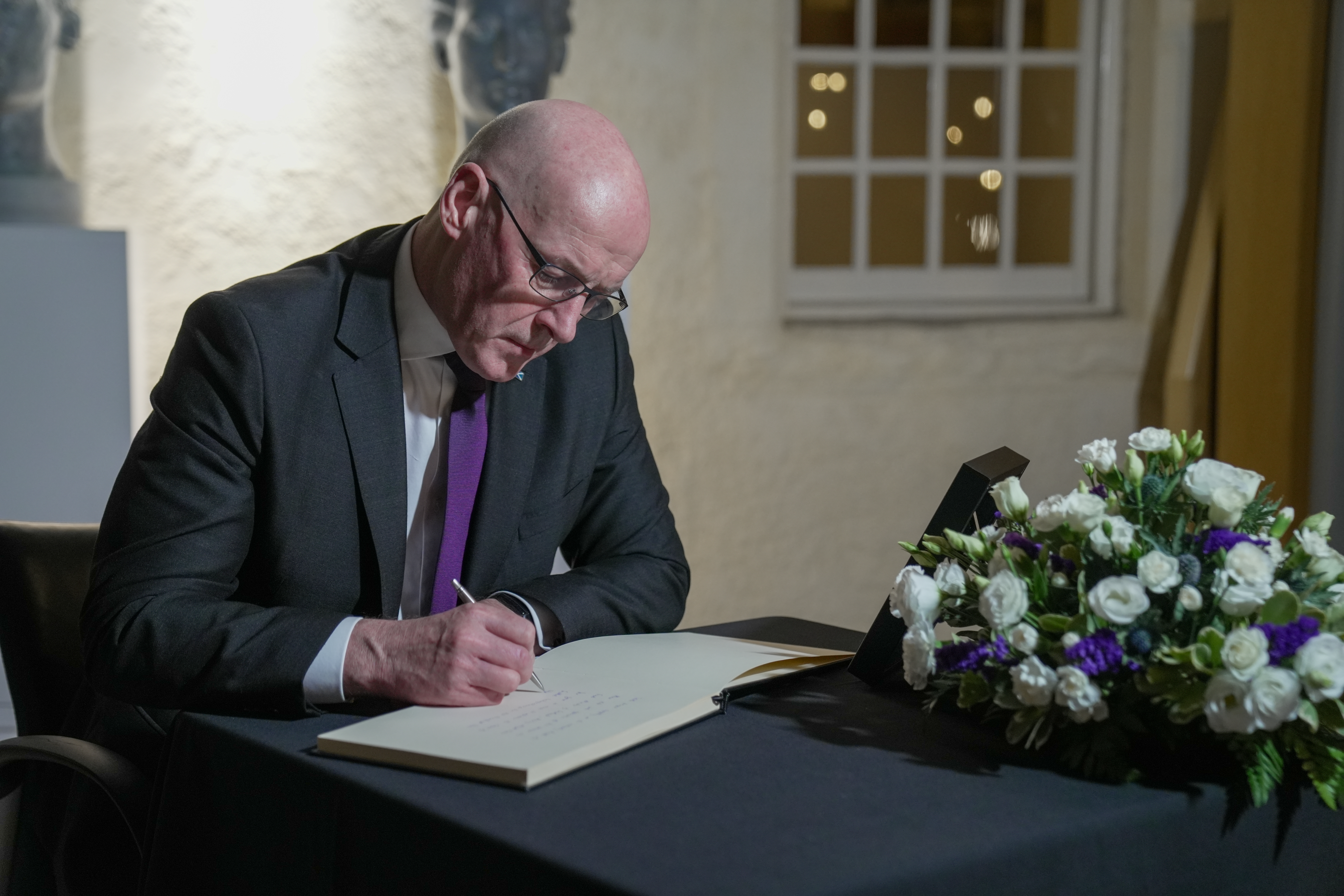
Swinney signs the book of condolence in the Scottish Parliament to Alex Salmond, 15 October 2024

On 12 October 2024, Alex Salmond, the former first minister of Scotland in which Swinney served in both the first and second Salmond governments as finance secretary, died in North Macedonia. On the day of his death, Salmond was highly critical of Swinney's attendance at the newly formed Council of Nations and Regions held in Edinburgh, having posted to X (formerly Twitter) that Swinney should have "politely declined the meeting with the words ‘Scotland is a country not a county". Swinney lead the Scottish Government tributes towards Salmond following the announcement of his death, stating that Salmond "inspired a generation of people to support Scottish independence". Swinney signed the book of condolence in the Scottish Parliament as part of the tributes.

On 22 October 2024, Swinney refused to confirm whether he would attend the memorial service for Alex Salmond, claiming that he would be "happy" to attend a memorial service but not confirming whether he would or not and would rather "judiciously follow" the wishes of Salmond's family. Swinney previous claimed in the months prior to Salmond's death that he felt "distant" from Salmond. When asked to clarify his position of attending the memorial event by Sky News, Swinney claimed he would "do whatever is appropriate as First Minister of Scotland and I will pay the appropriate tributes". He confirmed that he would lead the motion of condolence which was to be scheduled during a parliamentary sitting in the Scottish Parliament, further adding "if it’s appropriate for me to be at a memorial service I will do exactly that".

Nicola Sturgeon, who succeeded Salmond as first minister, and to whom Swinney had served as deputy first minister, had a public feud with Salmond in the years prior to his death and their relationship deteriorated. It was claimed that Sturgeon would not be invited to either a memorial service or Salmond's funeral, however, this was not confirmed by Swinney, the Scottish Government or Salmond's family. Salmond's funeral was held on 29 October 2014, with both Swinney or Sturgeon not being in attendance. A spokesperson for the Scottish Government confirmed that Sturgeon and Swinney did not attend the funeral service at the request of Salmond's family, but said that the wishes of both the first minister and Scottish Government remained with Salmond's family on the day of his funeral.

=== Healthcare ===
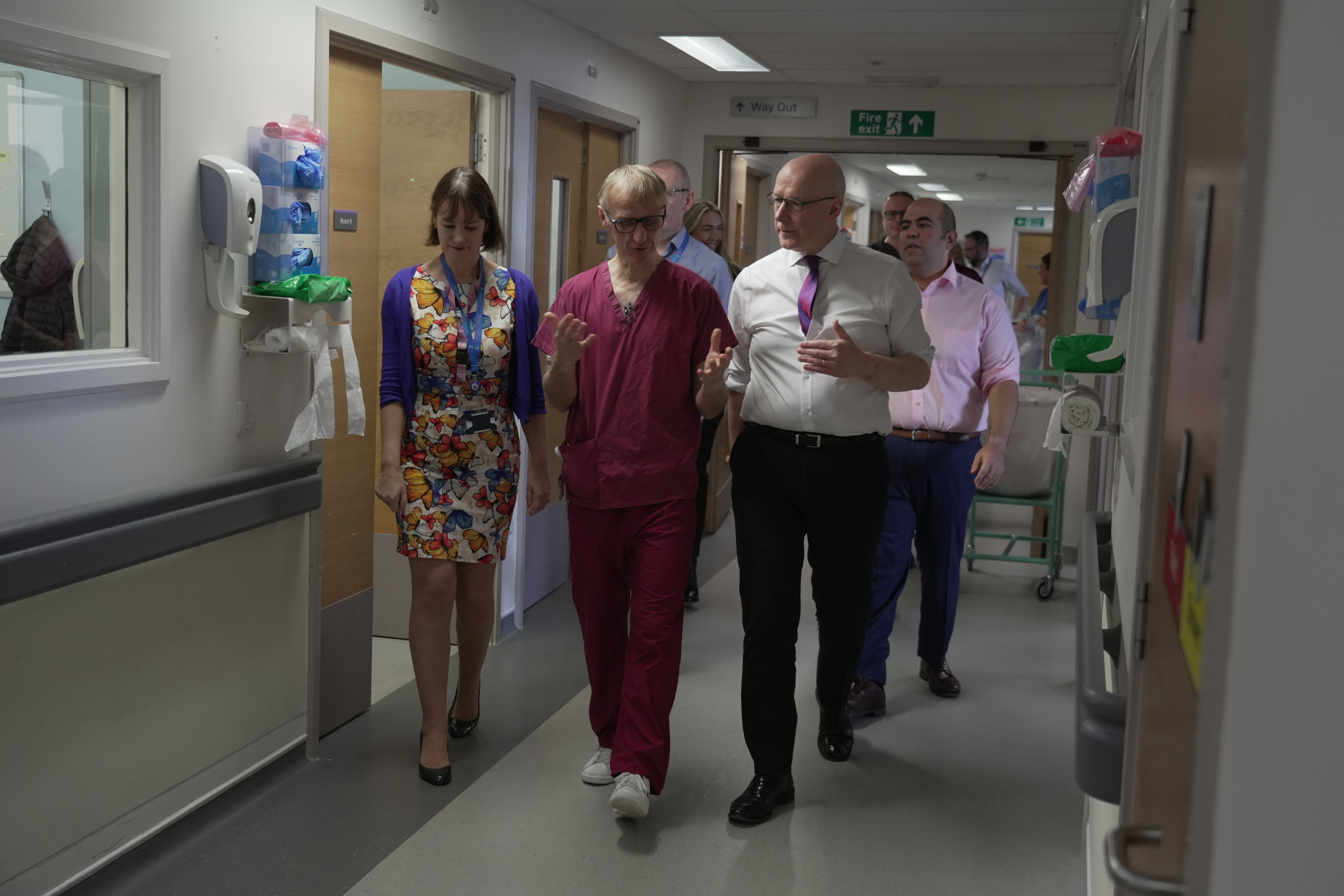
Swinney during a visit to Forth Valley Hospital, December 2024

Within the NHS Grampian health board, a "critical incident" was declared which resulted in patients being diverted from Aberdeen Royal Infirmary as a result of capacity concerns at the hospital. Ahead of the delivery of the Scottish budget in December 2024, Swinney claimed that spending for the NHS in Scotland would be "at the heart" of the forthcoming budget in order to support the "vital and precious" nature of the NHS.

In response to the critical incident declared in NHS Grampian, Swinney urged members of the public instead to vitalise other NHS services in order to access the right care at the quicker pace in order to reduce pressure on hospitals. Swinney stated that services such as "NHS Inform can be used in order to reduce demand on hospitals".

=== 2025 budget ===
On 4 December 2024, Swinney's Cabinet Secretary for Finance and Local Government Shona Robison delivered the Scottish budget for 2025 to the Scottish Parliament. In the budget, Robison pledged that the Scottish Government would end the two child benefit cap in 2026. Additionally, record spending for the National Health Service in Scotland was announced, with £21 billion being earmarked for the NHS in order to reduce waiting times and to ensure access to GPs was easier for the public. Additional measures announced in the budget included extra winter payments for the elderly, funding to tackle the climate emergency and scrapping the council tax freeze.

Opposition parties in the Scottish Parliament were critical of the budget, with Scottish Labour stating that the government was "going in the wrong direction", whilst the Scottish Conservatives claimed that budget was "more of the same" from previous budgets set by the Scottish Government.

=== Storm Éowyn ===
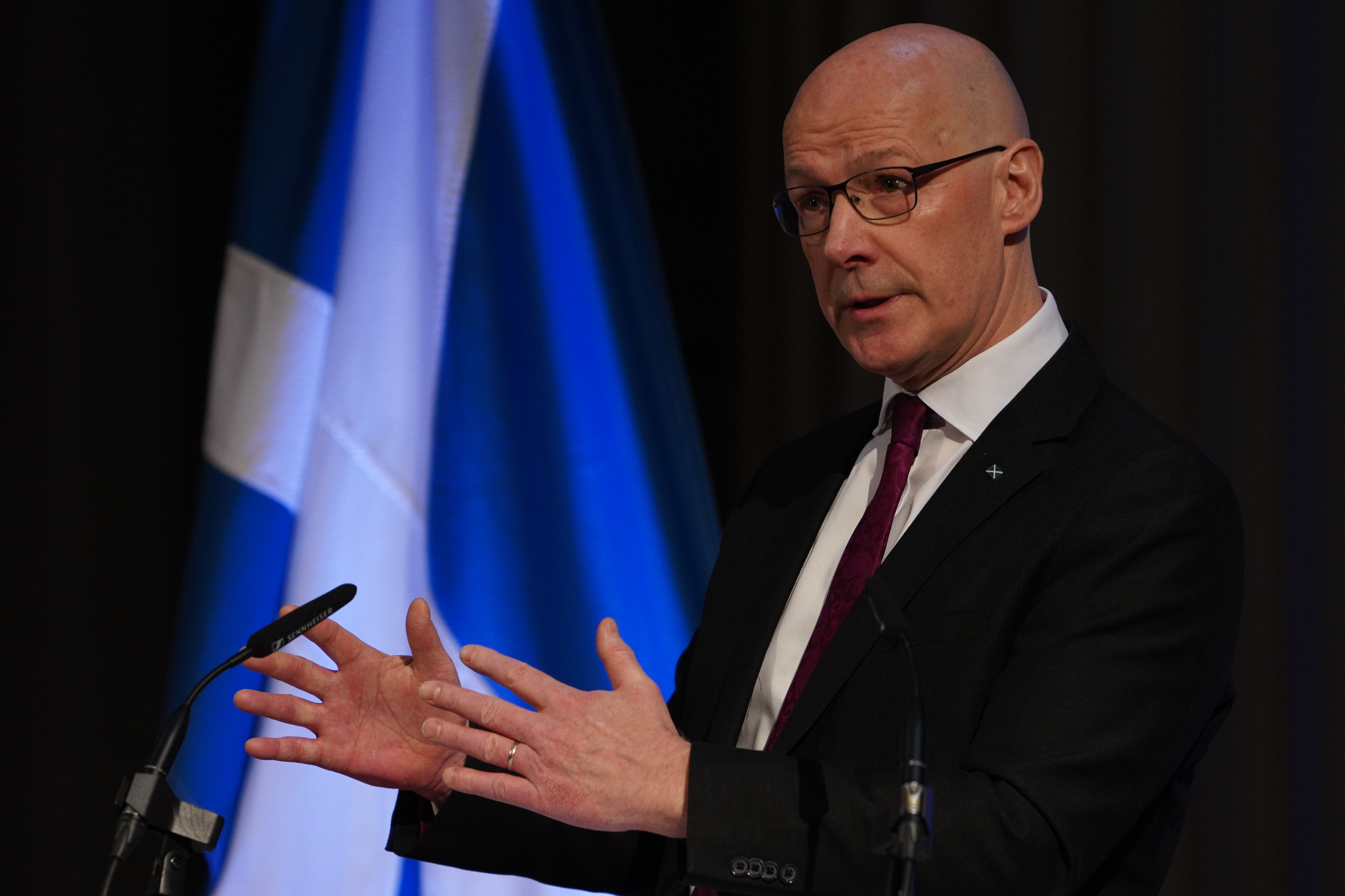
Swinney at the University of Edinburgh, Playfair Library, January 2025

In January 2025, the Met Office issued a rare Red alert warning for strong winds for much of Scotland, particularly the central belt and Scottish Lowlands which included areas such as Glasgow, East Ayrshire, South Ayrshire, Dumfries and Galloway and the Scottish Borders. Ahead of the strong winds associated with Storm Éowyn, Swinney urged the public "not to travel" and urged the public to take the alert seriously and follow all advice given by emergency services in preparation for the storm. On 23 January 2025, Swinney advised that local councils across Scotland would make decisions on areas such as schools closing during the storm, and advised that the Scottish Government Resilience Room had been activated to co-ordinate the government's response and preparation for the storm. Later that day, it was announced by individual local authorities in the Red alert areas that the majority of schools would be closed on the 24 January as a result of the storm.

Storm Éowyn made impact in Scotland on 24 January 2025, leaving around 117,000 homes across the country without power and electricity supply, with wind speeds as high as 102 mph recorded on the Tay Road Bridge. Swinney appealed to the public to have a "high level of vigilance", and expressed concerns about the number of HGVs on Scottish roads, claiming that "too many lorries are on the road and I urge all HGVs to follow Police Scotland advice not to travel during the red weather warning". All ScotRail train services were suspended and did not return to service until midday the following day. The Scottish Government Resilience Room met again on the evening of 24 January to co-ordinate the Scottish Government's response to the storm. Swinney praised the public for following advice from Police Scotland not to travel, attributing to "areas covered by the red warning has seen road usage been about 85% less than normal, and that is thanks to so many people heeding the advice not to travel".

Following the passing of the storm, the Scottish Government Resilience Room was activated once again on 25 January to co-ordinate the recovery efforts in the aftermath of Storm Éowyn. Swinney also joined a meeting of the Cabinet Office Briefing Rooms which was chaired by the Chancellor of the Duchy of Lancaster, Pat McFadden. Swinney advised the public that "partners are working at pace to ensure services can resume next week. Local authorities – who are responsible for school closures - will be working to ensure all buildings meet the required safety standards to reopen safely to pupils". Swinney also advised that the public "should prepare for continued disruption, especially in areas that have been impacted by a loss of power, and I encourage everyone to follow advice being issued by local authorities, as well as continuing to follow updates from national agencies".

Swinney issued a public statement on 25 January calling for "patience" as the cleanup operation began. Amber warnings for ice, snow and wind remained in place in most parts of Scotland over the weekend (24–26 January). Swinney stated that it was "clear the severity of Storm Éowyn will continue into next week and this will have an impact on the speed at which utilities and local services can fully resume".

=== Queen Elizabeth University Hospital infections scandal ===
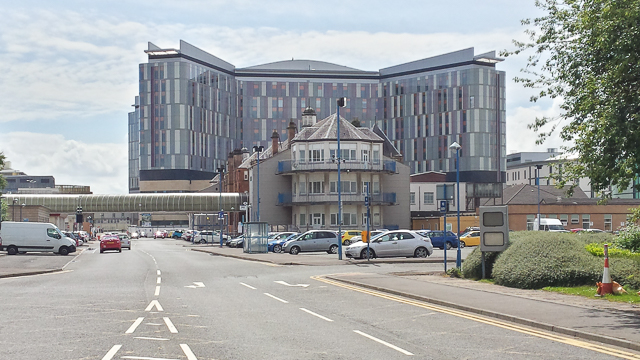
The Queen Elizabeth University Hospital in Glasgow

Between 2017 and 2021, at least 84 child patients at the Queen Elizabeth University Hospital were infected with rare bacteria while undergoing treatment, linked to contamination of the hospital's water supply by pigeon droppings. The deaths of four patients, including two 10-year-old children and one 73-year-old-woman, were linked to issues with the water system. In 2019, the Scottish Hospitals Inquiry was established to examine issues related to the construction and design of the hospital. In November 2023, NHS Greater Glasgow and Clyde was named as a suspect in a corporate homicide investigation relating to the deaths.

NHS Greater Glasgow and Clyde consistently denied any issues with the hospital's water system until January 2026, when it admitted in its closing statements to the inquiry that "on the balance of probabilities, there is a causal connection between some infections suffered by patients and the hospital environment, in particular the water system." NHS Greater Glasgow and Clyde also claimed that there had been pressure to deliver the project on-time and on-budget, and that the building opened too early and before it was ready.

The families of those who had died issued a statement through their solicitors, accusing NHS Greater Glasgow and Clyde of "deceit and conniving cowardice", and of smearing, demeaning, and misleading them in the course of the inquiry. Scottish Labour leader Anas Sarwar demanded the release of all documentation held by the Scottish Government relating to ministerial conduct during the scandal. When questioned in the Scottish Parliament, Swinney denied that there had been any political pressure to open the hospital before it was ready. Former First Minister Nicola Sturgeon - who had been health minister at the time the hospital was ordered and First Minister at the time it opened - also issued a statement saying, "Any suggestion that I applied pressure for the hospital to open before it was ready or that I had any knowledge of safety concerns at that time are completely untrue. NHS Greater Glasgow and Clyde later clarified that the pressure to open the hospital on-time and on-budget came from within the Health Board and not from Government Ministers, as had been alleged by opposition MSPs.

=== Scottish involvement in American strikes on Iran ===
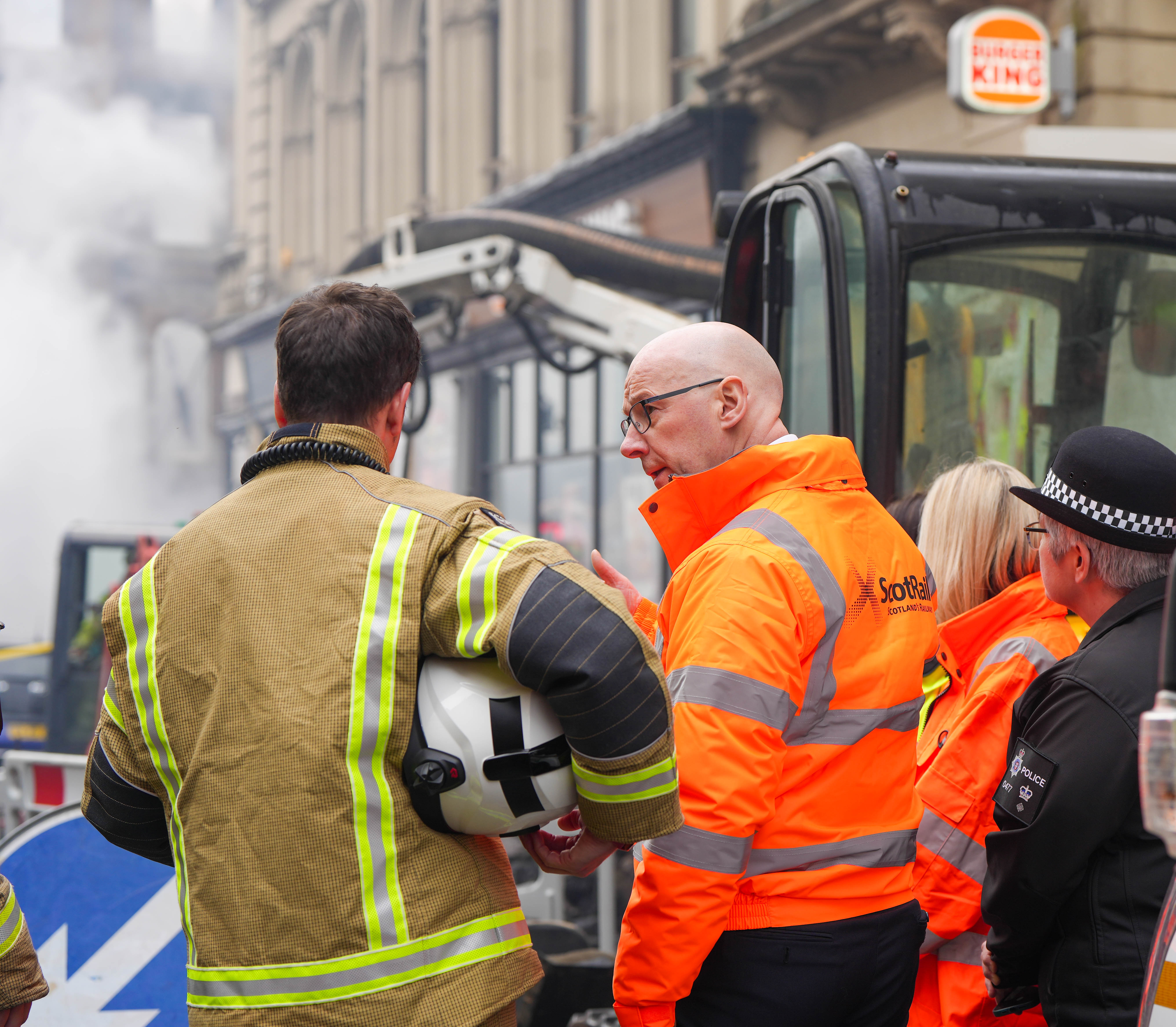
Swinney visits Union Street following the fire

Following the United States strikes on Iranian nuclear sites on 22 June 2025, politicians within the Scottish Parliament raised concerns over potential Scottish involvement in supporting the American operation, particularly the use the Scottish Government owned Glasgow Prestwick Airport which is frequently used as a refuelling stop for American military flights. The Cabinet Secretary for External Affairs, Angus Robertson, assured MSPs that the airport had not been involved in any part of the operation, including accommodating American fighters for refuelling. Swinney had called for a "deescalation" of the conflict, whilst Robertson highlighted the fact that Prestwick Airport was not only used for refuelling by American military aircraft, but also other allies including Canada.

=== 2026 Glasgow fire ===
On 8 March 2026, a large scale fire broke out at Union Street in Glasgow, next door to Glasgow Central railway station, the busiest railway hub in Scotland. Swinney said the incident was a serious event in the centre of Glasgow and thanked the emergency services for their response. He stated that the Scottish Government would work with partners including Glasgow City Council and Network Rail to support recovery efforts and assist businesses affected by the destruction of the building. Swinney also indicated that rebuilding and restoration of the site would be considered as part of the longer-term response to the fire.

== Second term (2026–present) ==
=== Scottish Parliament elections ===
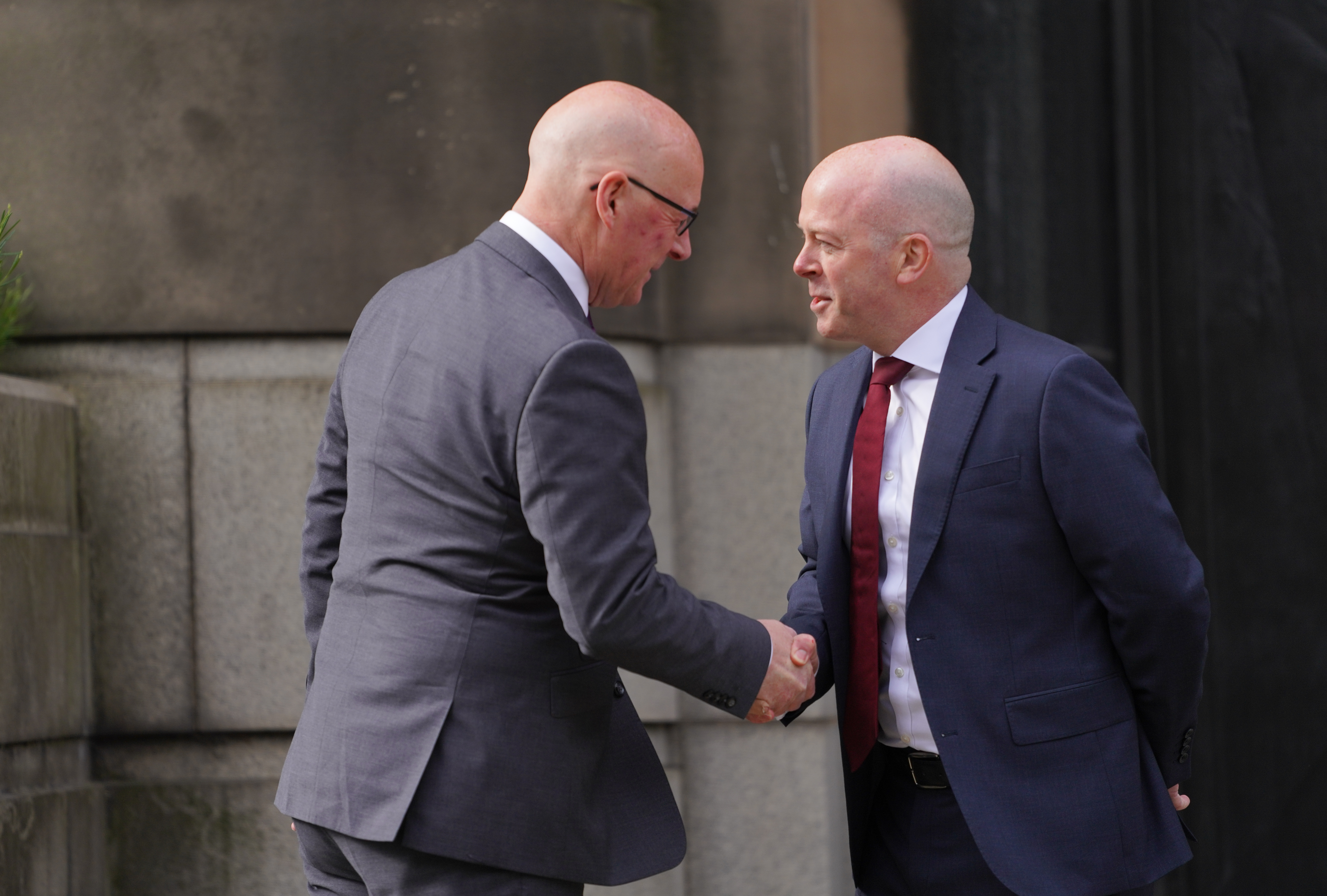
Swinney meets Permanent Secretary, Joe Griffin, outside St Andrew's House following his electoral victory, 11 May 2026

Following the 2026 Scottish Parliament election, the SNP were returned as the largest party, winning 58 seats across the country, but short of an overall majority. Swinney had previously claimed throughout the election campaign that a majority of seats for the SNP would be a mandate to hold a Second Scottish Independence referendum. Following the party's victory, Swinney said publicly that the SNP would work proactively with other political party's in the Scottish Parliament to "find common ground", but quickly dismissed Reform UK Scotland from cross–party talks, despite the party winning 17 seats through the regional list system. On his decision to exclude Reform UK Scotland, Swinney claimed he did so as the party "does not align" with his vision for Scotland.

Despite falling short of an overall parliamentary majority, Swinney advocated that the SNP still had a "significant mandate" for an independence referendum, claiming that the central government must not block the wishes of the people of Scotland. On 12 May 2026, it was announced that UK Prime Minister, Keir Starmer, agreed to hold talks with Swinney directly, with Swinney announcing that the constitutional future of Scotland will be discussed.

Due to political campaigning on the run up to the election, Swinney rejected an offer from the President of the United States, Donald Trump, to attend a state banquet at the White House. Despite this, Trump called Swinney following his election victory, with Trump describing Swinney as a "good man" who was deserving of "his big electoral victory".

=== Cabinet appointments ===
Swinney was formally re–elected at First Minister following a vote in the Scottish Parliament on 19 May 2026. Following this, media outlets began speculating potential cabinet ministers, with Stephen Flynn poised for Cabinet Secretary for Energy, whilst The Scotsman speculated that Màiri McAllan could be tipped for Deputy First Minister, succeeding Kate Forbes. Swinney announced his cabinet appointments on 20 May 2026, reducing the size of the cabinet to nine from twelve, with Jenny Gilruth appointed Deputy First Minister and Cabinet Secretary for Finance and Local Government, whilst newly elected MSP Stephen Flynn was appointed Cabinet Secretary for Economy, Tourism and Transport. Swinney described his cabinet appointments as a "leaner, more agile government".

Lord Advocate Dorothy Bain had announced her resignation from her post in May 2026, and was succeeded by her Solicitor General for Scotland, Ruth Charteris to the role in June 2026. B. J. Gill was appointed the new Solicitor General for Scotland in June 2026, succeeded Charteris.

=== July 2026 wildfires ===
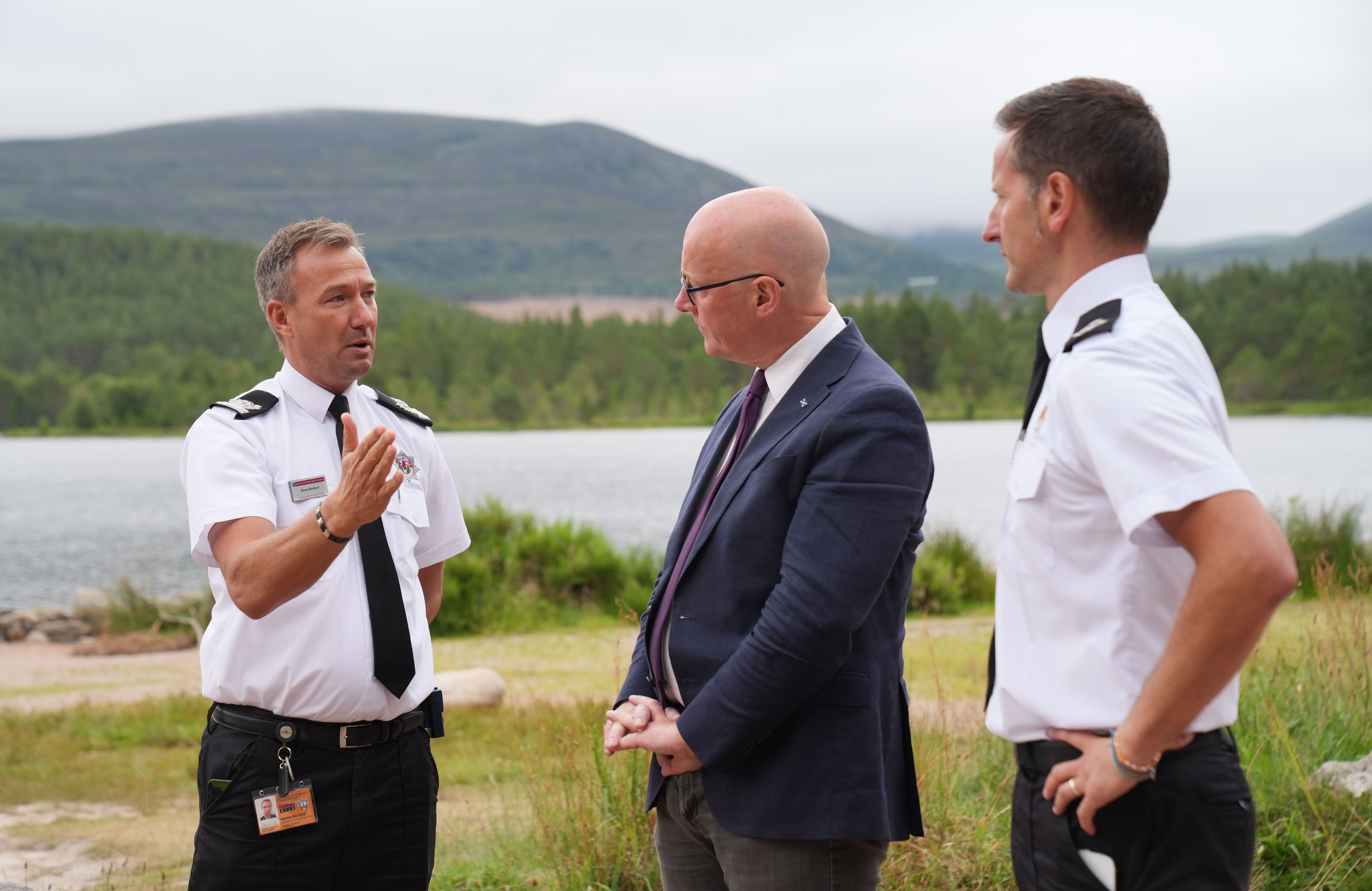
Swinney visits the site of the Cairngorms wild fires

Following a period of hot and dry weather across mainland Scotland, parts of the country experienced wildfires, including the Cairngorms, which resulted in smoke billowing in the direction of Aberdeen some 59 miles away. In response, Swinney highlighted the risks of climate change, and said that there must be a "combined effort" to ensure the fire service has the required resources to tackle the blaze. Swinney and the Scottish Government had previously been critiqued over the allocation and method of funding the Scottish Fire and Rescue Service by opposition parties in the Scottish Parliament. Swinney visited the site of the wildfires at the Cairngorms and thanked emergency services for their response and efforts to contain the fire, recognising the "combined effort led by the Scottish Fire and Rescue Service, but involving land managers in the locality, involving organisations like the RSPB and the Cairngorms National Park and also Forestry and Land Scotland".

In response to claims of underfunding for the Scottish Fire and Rescue Service, Swinney highlighted that through the 2026 Scottish budget, the Fire and Rescue Service received an increase in funding from the Scottish Government, stating that "We’ve got to make sure resources are deployed in a way that meets the challenges that we face as a society and that will be at the heart of the dialogue that takes place around budget priorities...".

== International relations ==
=== Europe ===
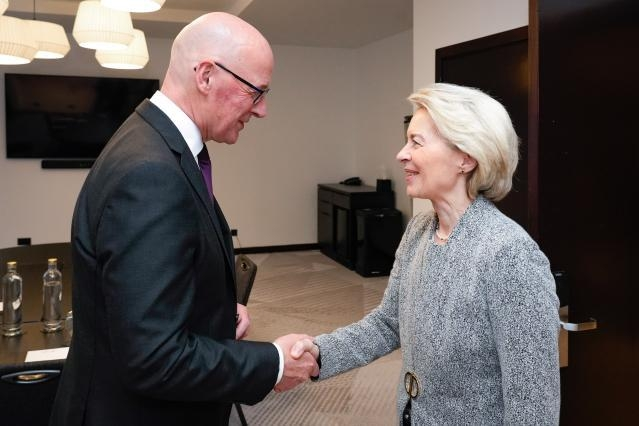
Swinney meets with President of the European Commission, Ursula von der Leyen, July 2025

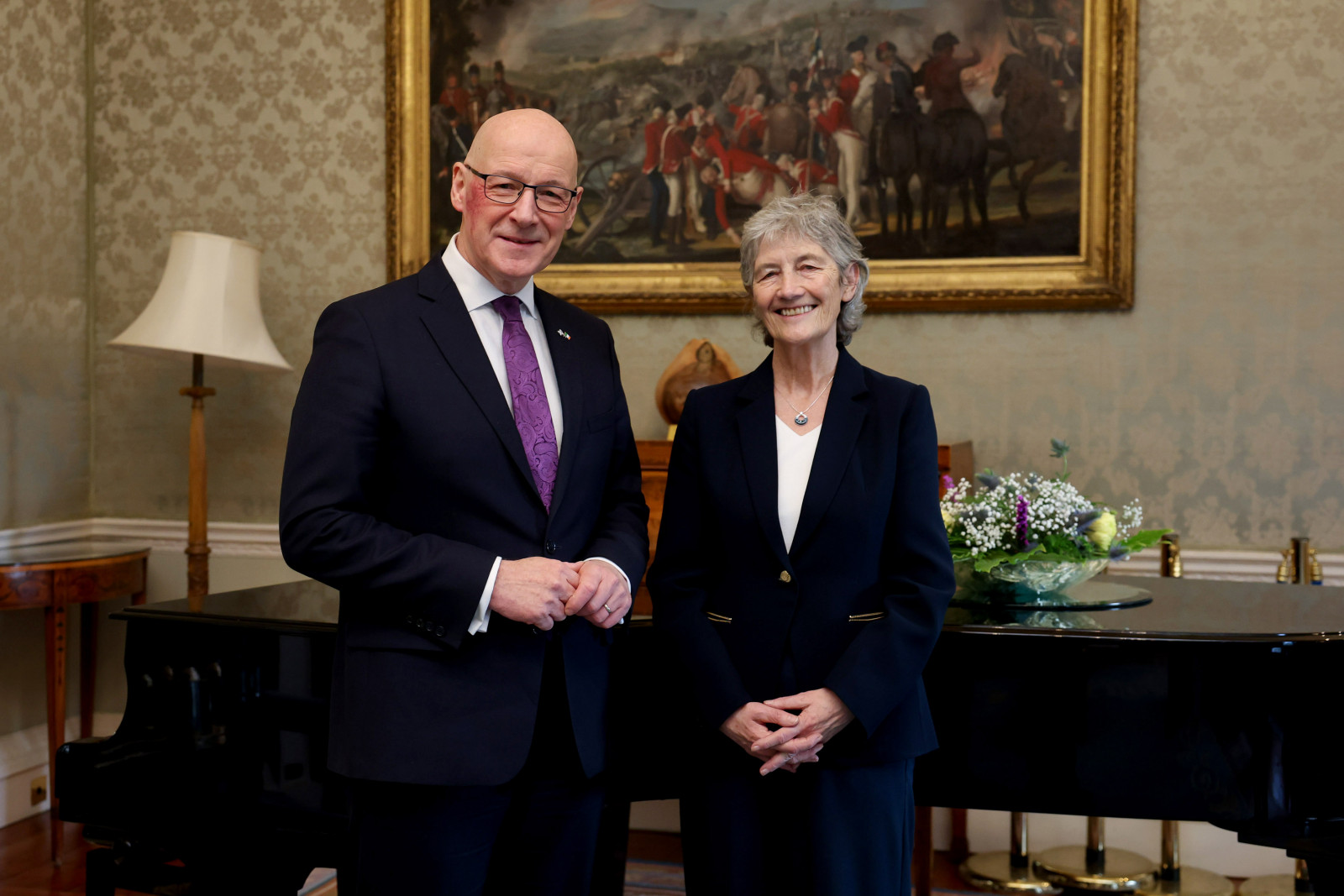
Swinney meets with President of Ireland, Catherine Connolly, in Dublin, November 2025

In June 2024, Swinney undertook his first official overseas visit as First Minister to Germany. During his visit, Swinney met with the European Affairs Minister, Eric Beißwenger, in Bavaria. During the visit, Beißwenger said that it was a "great honour" to have Swinney visit Germany and Bavaria, further adding "Bavaria and Scotland have long maintained close bilateral contacts, which have been gradually expanded and formalised since the early 2000s. We are also united by self-confidence and a certain tendency towards independence".

In December 2024, Scotland hosted the 42nd British–Irish Council summit in Edinburgh which was led by Swinney as first minister. During the summit, Swinney welcomed the UK Prime Minister Keir Starmer, Taoiseach Simon Harris, the First Minister and deputy First Minister of Northern Ireland, the heads of government of Jersey, the Isle of Man and Guernsey, as well as the first minister of Wales, Eluned Morgan to Edinburgh for discussions on net zero and economic growth.

Swinney had his first meeting with the President of the European Commission, Ursula von der Leyen, in Glasgow in July 2025. During the discussions, Swinney and Leyen discussed relations with the European Union as well as the ongoing conflicts in both Gaza and Ukraine. Swinney also said he used the talks as an opportunity to highlight Scotland's "commitment to work with European partners on key issues such as energy".

=== United States ===
In December 2024, Swinney and President-elect of the United States, Donald Trump, spoke via telephone in which Swinney congratulated Trump on his election victory. The call was requested by Trump's associates and during the conversation both Swinney and Trump discussed trade, cultural ties and the importance of the American trading market to Scotland. Swinney stated that he was "hopeful" that both Scotland and the United States would "continue to work together". Swinney had previously backed Trump's rival, Kamala Harris, for the 2024 United States presidential election.

Ahead of the second inauguration of Donald Trump as the president of the United States, experts indicated that Swinney and Trump would have a "complicated relationship" with "difficulties", despite Trump's family connections, business enterprises and overall affinity for Scotland. Before his inauguration, Trump discussed the prospects of trade tariffs on foreign trade into the United States, in which Swinney responded by stating he would be willing to use "Trump's affinity and history with Scotland" as an advantage in any potential trade talks. Swinney had previously spoken with Trump prior to his inauguration, and highlighted the importance to Scottish and American trade, particularly in the Scotch whisky sector.

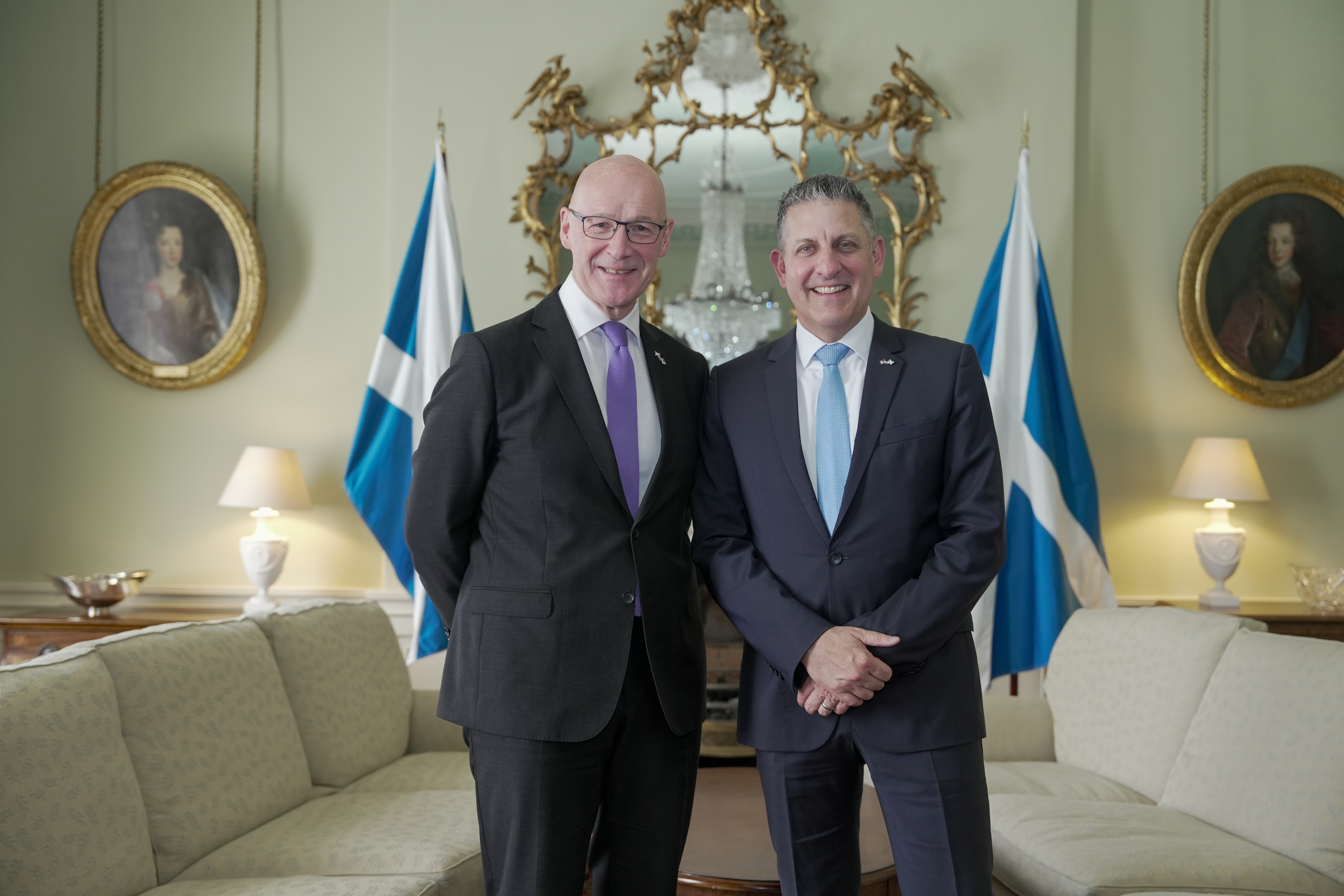
Swinney with Consul General of the U.S. in Edinburgh, Jack Hillmeyer, 2024

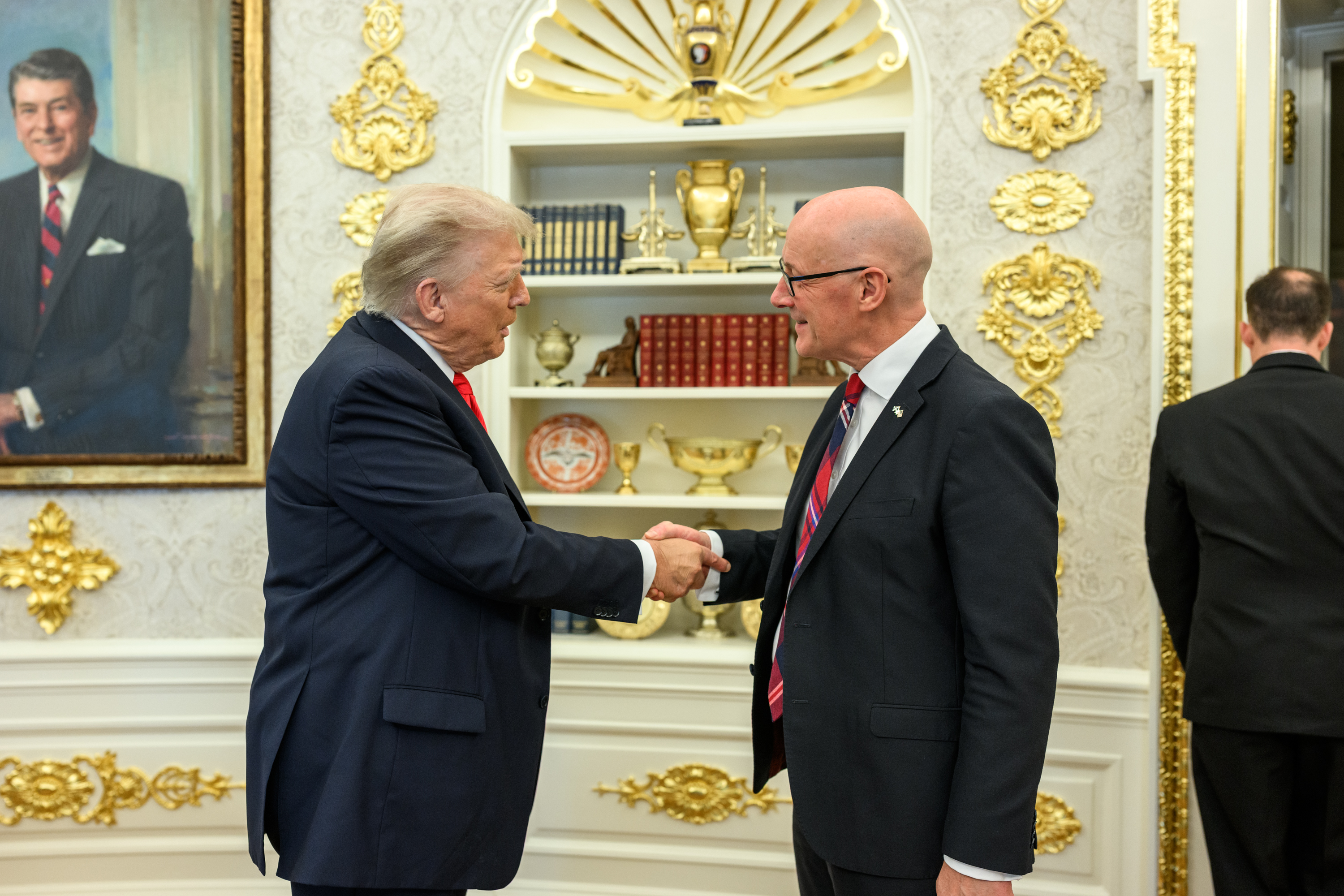
Swinney is welcomed to the Oval Office at the White House by U.S. President, Donald Trump

As a result of Trump's controversial policies and views, members of the Scottish Green Party urged the Scottish Government and other members of the Scottish Parliament not to meet Trump if he were to visit Scotland. In response, Swinney assured the parliament that he would "not refuse to meet" with Trump as president if he visited Scotland, further claiming he felt that the public would "not understand what I was doing if I refused to meet with the President of the United States". Swinney later issued a statement saying that the incumbent first minister in their capacity as the head of the Scottish Government could "not turn down an offer by Trump or his team to meet", claiming that "as the First Minister of Scotland, I would have to engage with the president of the United States if he wished to engage with me".

Swinney met with Trump on 29 July 2025, during his five day private visit to Trump International's golf courses in Scotland. Swinney said that he would use the talks with Trump as an opportunity to raise the "unimaginable suffering" in Gaza. As part of Trump's visit, Swinney announced £180,000 of public money to support the 2025 Nexo Championship of the DP World Tour, to be held at Trump International Golf Links. Swinney described the funding as an opportunity to "further enhance Aberdeenshire's reputation as a leading golfing destination". Swinney's announcement met with intense criticism from across the political spectrum: the Scottish Conservatives accused Swinney of hypocrisy for supporting protests against Trump's visit while giving public money to his golf course. Monica Lennon of Scottish Labour described the decision as "completely ridiculous", and accused Swinney of paying "£180,000 of our money for a five minute meet-and-greet with Donald Trump". Former SNP health secretary Alex Neil described it as "an outrageous waste of public money" that should have been "given to cash-strapped organisations providing essential services for Scotland's poor." Patrick Harvie of the Scottish Greens compared the funding to "offering up pocket money to the school bully," adding, "Scotland should be ashamed of this."

Swinney faced strong criticism for attending a state banquet at Windsor Castle in honour of Donald Trump during his 2025 state visit to the UK: SNP MP Chris Law posted then hastily deleted a tweet saying, "Sitting at tonight's banquet dinner with President Donald Trump, is conceding that it's acceptable to support genocide in Gaza". Co-leader of the Scottish Greens Ross Greer called on Swinney to boycott the dinner, saying, "Donald Trump is one of the most dishonest, disgraced and dishonourable people in the world. He is the last person on earth who deserves a banquet in their honour." Swinney insisted that it was in Scotland's interests for him to attend the dinner, saying, "I don't think people in Scotland would understand their first minister leaving Scotland's seat empty, when there are big issues that affect the jobs and the livelihoods of people in Scotland." Northern Irish First Minister Michelle O'Neill and Welsh First Minister Eluned Morgan both refused to attend the dinner.

==== Remarks by Vice President Vance ====
During a speech to the Munich Security Conference in February 2025, Vice President of the United States, JD Vance, criticised the Scottish Government and their policy on buffer zones outside abortion clinics. Vance told the Munich Security Conference that "in October, the Scottish Government began distributing letters to citizens whose houses lay within so-called Safe Access Zones, warning them that even private prayer within their own homes may amount to breaking the law". In response, a spokesperson for the Scottish Government branded Vance's comments as "dangerous", adding that "no letters had been sent out saying people couldn't pray in their homes", and confirmed that only "intentional or reckless behaviour" was covered by the act referred to by Vance.

==== Trump import tariffs ====
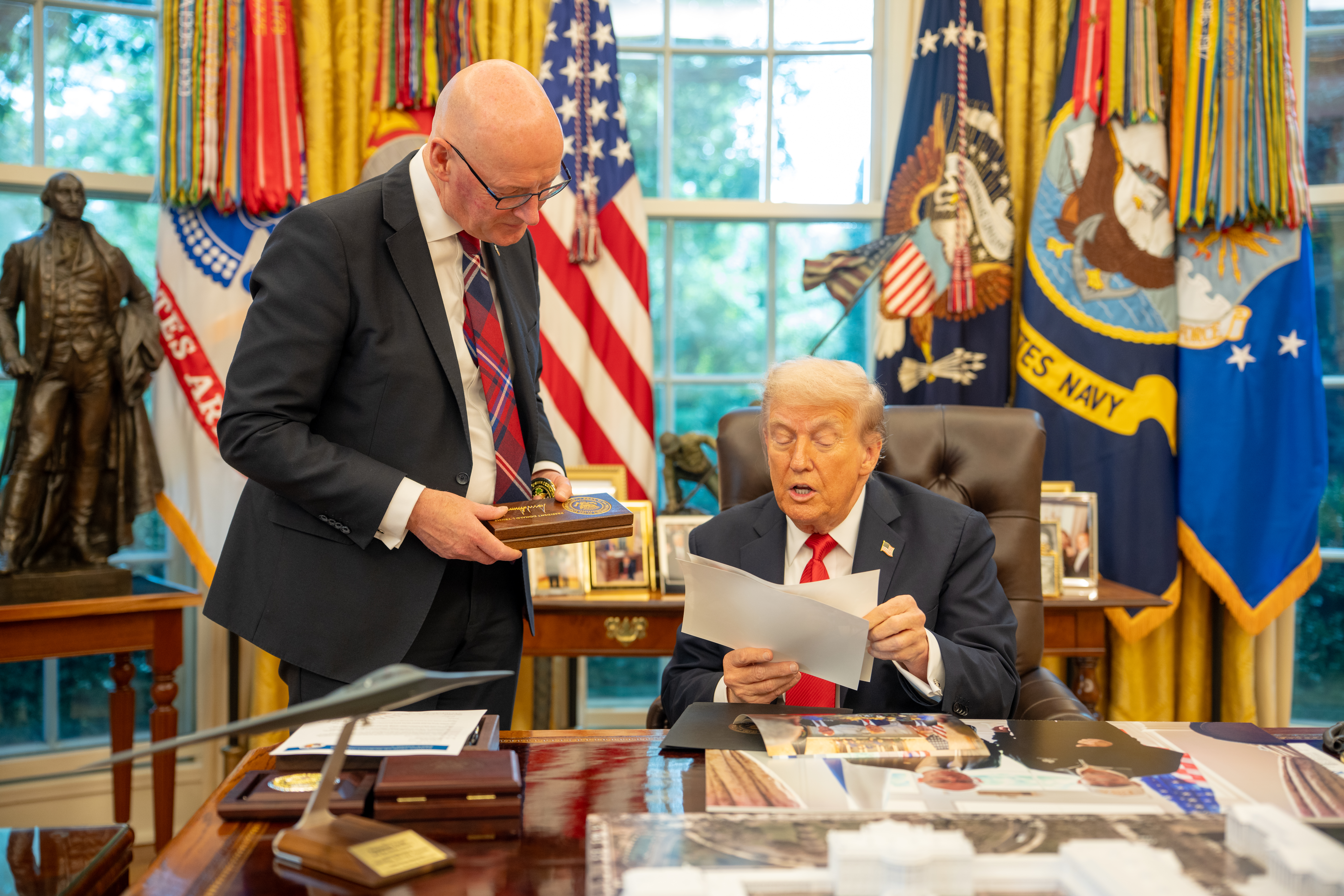
Swinney meets U.S. President Donald Trump in the Oval Office at the White House to discuss import tariffs regarding Scotch whisky

In April 2025, U.S. President Donald Trump announced a number of tariffs on foreign imports into the United States. Scottish products were affected by a 10% tariff, something in which Deputy First Minister Kate Forbes claimed would "have negative impact on Scotland's economy", whilst Swinney said that the tariffs were "very damaging" for the Scottish economy", but expressed hope for Trump's "deep personal connection to Scotland" would help avoid US trade barriers.

Swinney announced to the Scottish Parliament in April 2025 that he would "leave no stone unturned" in taking forward concerns from Scottish businesses regarding the trade tariffs, particularly concerns raised by the Scotch whisky industry. Business with the United States contributes £971 million per year for the Scotch whisky industry. Speaking about the tariffs in his first official visit to the United States since becoming First Minister, Swinney condemned Trump's tariffs, stating that "it is undeniable the advent of tariffs is a blow to Scotland". He confirmed that whilst visiting the United States, no plans were in place to meet with representatives from the Trump administration to discuss the tariffs.

Swinney met with Trump on 29 July 2025 during his five day private visit to his golf course at Turnberry, South Ayrshire. Swinney said that he would use the talks with Trump as an opportunity to raise the issue of the 10% tariff imposed on Scotch whisky by his administration. Swinney also met with Trump in the Oval Office at the White House on 9 September 2025, where better tariffs on imports to the United States of Scotch whisky from Scotland were discussed, along with international conflicts in Gaza and Qatar. No reduction in whisky tariffs was forthcoming following either of Trump and Swinney's meetings.

In April 2026, Trump announced the lifting of tariffs following a direct request from King Charles III during his state visit to the United States. Swinney’s earlier meetings with Trump in July and September 2025, in which he raised concerns about the impact of tariffs on the Scotch whisky industry, formed part of broader efforts by multiple stakeholders to bring attention to the issue.

Following the announcement, Swinney and Trump held further communication, including a direct phone call, during which the tariff decision and its impact were discussed. Swinney subsequently stated that Trump had expressed appreciation for the issue being raised with him previously. Public statements issued after the exchange indicated that Trump acknowledged the discussions he had held with Swinney on Scotch whisky tariffs with Trump stating that Swinney played a “major part” in ending the tariffs on Scotch whisky.

Swinney however faced criticism for attempting to claim credit for Trump removing the tariffs when an image shared by the SNP, featuring Swinney's likeness and signature and claiming that Swinney "fought for Scotch whisky and he delivered", was widely ridiculed. The SNP's opponents accused Swinney and the SNP of having "some brass neck" for trying to claim credit for the tariff relief. Scottish Conservative MSP Murdo Fraser posted on X: "John Swinney claims credit for the discovery of penicillin, the moon landings, and Scotland qualifying for the 2026 World Cup." Scotland Secretary Douglas Alexander said that the leading role had been played by UK Government negotiators and that neither of Swinney's meetings with Trump had led to a reduction in tariffs.

=== Middle East ===
Swinney has called for an immediate ceasefire in the Gaza war, and for a de-escalation of the conflict between Iran and Israel, citing "potential dangers of the military intervention" in the aftermath of the attack on Iranian nuclear sites conducted by the United States in late June 2025. Despite this, Swinney did not fully condemn the President of the United States, Donald Trump, for authorising the attacks.

In August 2024, Swinney's Cabinet Secretary for External Affairs, Angus Robertson, faced intense criticism from within the Scottish National Party when he was photographed meeting with Daniela Grudsky Ekstein, the Deputy Ambassador of Israel to the UK. The Israeli embassy said that Grudsky Ekstein had discussed the release of Israeli hostages with Robertson, and that Israel was "looking forward to cooperating" with Scotland in areas including culture and renewables. The photograph provoked uproar within the SNP, and several SNP MSPs and former ministers called for Robertson's resignation. Swinney said that Robertson met with Grudsky Ekstein with his full knowledge and permission, and that he stood by his decision to accept the Israeli embassy's request for a meeting. Swinney defended the meeting as an opportunity to convey the Scottish Government's "consistent position on the killing and suffering of innocent civilians in the region."

An investigation by The Ferret and The National revealed in July 2025 that Swinney had actively sought a meeting with the Israeli ambassador Tzipi Hotovely from early June 2024. Emails and WhatsApp messages obtained under Freedom of Information legislation revealed that Scottish Government ministers and senior advisers were closely involved in managing the meeting, with discussions focused on communications strategy and anticipating FOI requests. A Scottish Government official was quoted as saying, "Transparency is obviously a good thing, but it takes up such a lot of our time." The minutes of the meeting between Robertson and Grudsky Ekstein were heavily redacted, but described Scotland and Israel as "critical friends". Robertson had previously claimed that one of the priorities for the meeting was to express the Scottish Government's support for an "end of UK arms being sent to Israel", however there was no mention of this in the minutes released. Following the revelations, Scottish Labour MSP Mercedes Villalba said the Swinney's government had "actively sought a meeting with a representative of a state whose prime minister is now wanted by the ICC for crimes against humanity". Amnesty International accused the Scottish Government's actions of not matching its rhetoric, and demanded "absolute clarity" on whether Robertson strongly challenged Israel over its conduct in Gaza. Simon Barrow, national secretary of the SNP Trade Union Group, the party's largest affiliate body, demanded "appropriate reparative action" on Swinney's part.

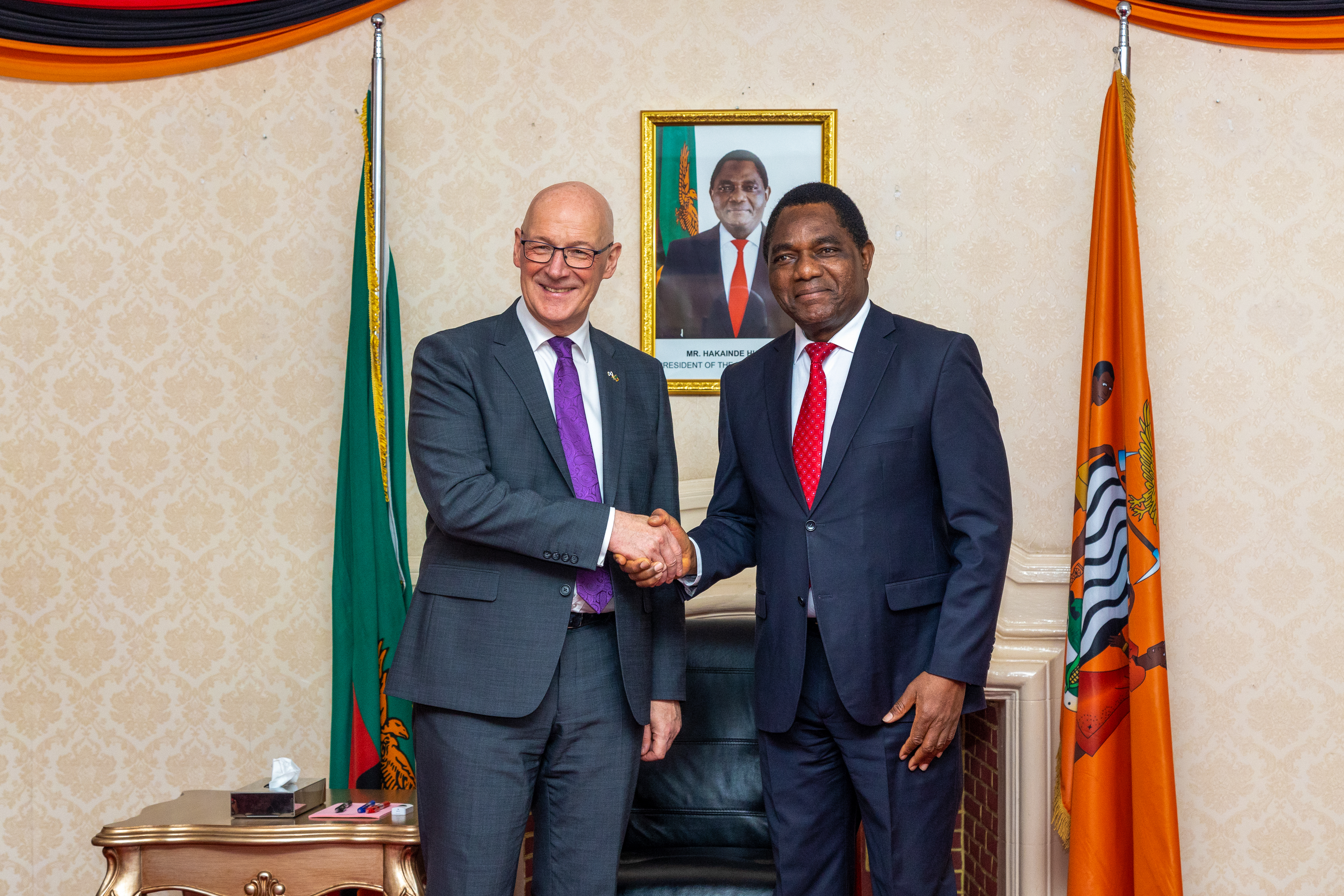
Swinney meets with President of Zambia, Hakainde Hichilema, October 2025

=== Africa ===
In October 2025, Swinney made two official visits to the African continent when he visited both Malawi and Zambia. Ahead of the visits, Swinney suggested that both Scotland and the Scottish Government have a "moral obligation" to support the global south in the fields of climate change, health care and equality. During the visits, Swinney investigated the impact and progress of several Scottish Government funded initiatives in both countries, including dental care, and marked the 20th anniversary since the singing of the Scotland Malawi Partnership.

During his visit to the Zambian capital city, Swinney pledged £125,000 for the charity Kids Operating Room in order to support the adaptation of NASA technology to generate oxygen in low-resource settings. Additionally, Swinney pledged £4 million of Scottish Government investment over the next three years to support combating diseases that "cannot be transmitted from person to person", such as diabetes, heart disease and sickle cell disease. Swinney's visit to Malawi marked the first visit of a sitting First Minister to the country since the signing of the Scotland Malawi Partnership agreement in 2005, as well as the first time a sitting First Minister has visited Zambia.

=== International visits ===
| # | Country | Areas visited | Dates | Details |
|---|---|---|---|---|
| 1 | Germany | Munich | 14 June 2024 | During his inaugural visit to Germany, Swinney met with the Bavarian Minister of State for Europe and International Affairs, Eric Beißwenger and Jill Gallard, the UK Ambassador to Germany. Swinney also attended the opening match of the Scotland national football team against the Germany national football team in the opening match of UEFA Euro 2024 |
| 2 | United States | New York City | 4–8 April 2025 | Swinney travelled to the United States to attend a series of Tartan Day events. Ahead of his visit, Swinney announced that he or Scottish Government ministers had "no plans" to meet with representations from the United States government as a result on the ongoing dispute over trade tariffs |
| 3 | Italy | Rome | 26 April 2025 | Swinney attended the funeral of Pope Francis alongside other international leaders. |
| 4 | United States | Washington D.C. | 9 September 2025 | Swinney travelled to the United States to promote and make a fresh appeal for better trade terms for Scotch whisky. He met with U.S. President Donald Trump and the United States Secretary of State, Marco Rubio in the Oval Office at the White House, where Swinney put forward the case for a better tariff deal for the Scotch whisky industry to the President. Additionally, Swinney raised the international situation including the ongoing conflict in Gaza and Qatar with both Trump and Rubio. |
| 5 | Zambia | Lusaka | 16 October 2025 | Swinney travelled to Zambia to "tackle global health challenges" and to raise health problems with the President of Zambia, Hakainde Hichilema. Swinney also discussed inequality in education in Zambia, as well as gender equality. During their discussions, both Swinney and Hicilema discussed ways to strengthen the connections between both Scotland and Zambia. |
| 6 | Malawi | | 17–21 October 2025 | In a similar manner to his visit to Zambia, Swinney will discussion education, health and gender equality whilst in Malawi. During the visit to Malawi, Swinney pledged £4 million of Scottish Government aid to towards the Malawi Health Service Joint Fund, a new "innovative approach that delivers partner-led development and to assist in the establishment of life-saving and sustainable healthcare in Malawi". |
| 7 | United States | Boston | 12–14 June 2026 | Swinney visited the city of Boston in the United States in his capacity as First Minister as a representative of Scotland and the Scottish Government to celebrate the Scotland national football team's participation in the 2026 FIFA World Cup. During his two day visit, Swinney met with business leaders and investors to promote Scotland as a place of trade and investment, and attended the Tartan Army Sunshine Appeal charity presentation. Swinney also engaged in a bilateral meeting with the Mayor of Boston, Michelle Wu, with a particular focus on areas relating to strengthening cultural and economic ties between Boston and Scotland. Additionally, Swinney hosted a kick-off reception with the Governor of Massachusetts, Maura Healey. |
