= Leslie Evans =

Permanent Secretary to the Scottish Government

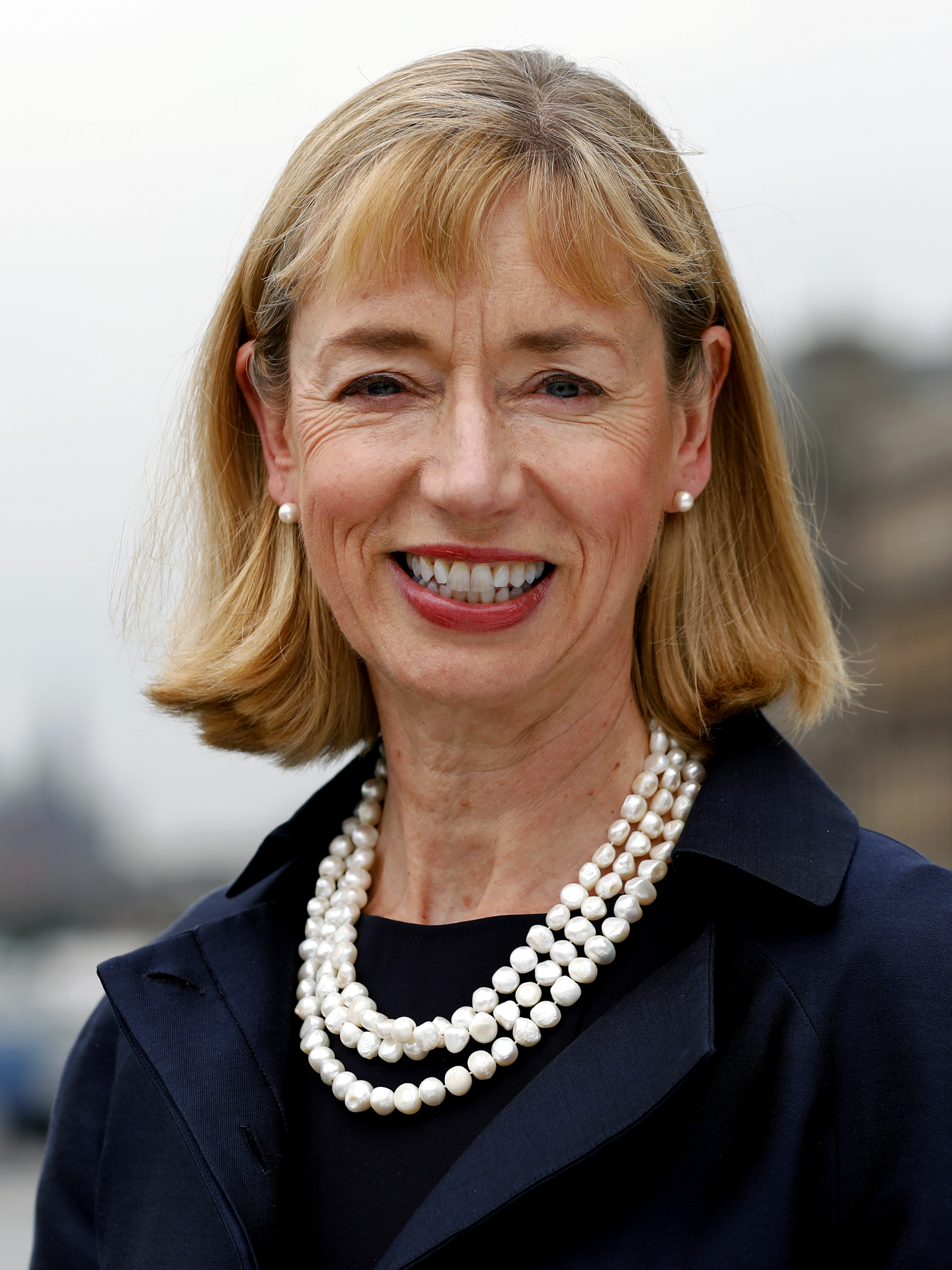

Permanent Secretary to the Scottish Government
- In office July 2015 – 31 December 2021
- First Minister: Nicola Sturgeon
- Preceded by: Sir Peter Housden
- Succeeded by: John-Paul Marks

Personal details
- Born: 11 December 1958 (age 67) Northern Ireland
- Education: University of Liverpool
- Profession: Civil Servant

Leslie Evans (born 11 December 1958) is the former Permanent Secretary to the Scottish Government. In this role, Evans was the principal policy adviser to the First Minister and Secretary to the Scottish Cabinet. Evans was the senior civil servant in Scotland and led more than 5,000 civil servants working for the Scottish Government, supporting development, implementation and communication of government policies, in accordance with the Civil Service Code. At a UK level, she was a member of the Civil Service Board. She was succeeded as Permanent Secretary by John-Paul Marks in January 2022.

== Early life ==
Evans was born in Northern Ireland. She was educated at High Storrs School in Sheffield and studied Music at the University of Liverpool. She has lived in Scotland since 1985 and is a feminist.

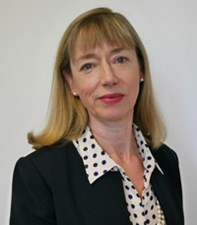
Official government portrait of Evans, 2016

== Career ==
Evans joined the Scottish Government in September 2000, having spent 20 years working for local authorities in Scotland (City of Edinburgh Council and Stirling Council) and England (Greenwich London Borough Council and Sheffield City Council).

Her previous post within the Scottish Government was Director General Learning and Justice. Previous positions include Head of Local Government Constitution & Governance Division, Head of Public Service Reform Group, Head of Tourism, Culture and Sport, and Director of Culture, External Affairs and Tourism.

In May 2015, it was announced that Evans would be the first woman to become the Permanent Secretary to the Scottish Government, taking up the position on 1 July 2015. As of 2015, Evans was paid a salary of between £160,000 and £164,999 by the Scottish Government (her salary was around £175,000 a year), making her one of the 328 most highly paid people in the British public sector at that time.

=== Alex Salmond case controversy ===
In 2020 former Scottish First Minister Alex Salmond alleged serious misconduct by Evans in her handling of accusations of sexual misconduct against him. Salmond won a judicial review of the Scottish Government's complaints process, which was ruled to be "unlawful", "procedurally unfair" and "tainted by apparent bias", and Salmond called for Evans to quit following the ruling. Legal bills cost the taxpayer £630,773, made up of a £512,250 settlement to Salmond from public funds for his legal costs, and the Scottish Government’s own legal costs of £118,523. After a High Court case, HM Advocate v Salmond, in which Salmond was cleared of allegations of attempted rape, details of memos sent by Evans emerged. She stated "We may lose the battle, but we will win the war.”, in relation to the case against Salmond, which he argued did not "seem the words of an impartial public servant", and he suggested it was evidence she had been responsible for the unlawful and biased complaints process.

The Scottish Government's website describes Ms Evans as being the principal accountable officer for the Scottish Government, with personal responsibility for the propriety and regularity of government finance and for economic, efficient and effective use of all related resources. It is for this reason that her role in the failed harassment enquiries against a former First Minister have been scrutinised. Noel Dolan, who was Nicola Sturgeon's senior special adviser when she was deputy first minister under Salmond, said Evans had to go for the "good" of the Scottish civil service, adding: "The original inquiry was a mess. Leslie Evans should stand down; she cost the Scottish taxpayer a large amount of money, and should have gone in 2019."

In January 2020, it was announced that Evans will remain in post until spring 2022.

After losing the judicial review, the Scottish government instigated an independent review by Laura Dunlop QC of the handling of complaints against current or former ministers. This reported in March 2021, recommending that investigation of complaints against former ministers should be fully independent as the current procedure was "self-evidently problematic", saying "the risks of perception of bias, either in favour of or against the person complained about, are obvious". Evans had previously said it would be "unusual in employment policies to have any independent element until after the procedure has been exhausted".

An inquiry by the Committee on the Scottish Government Handling of Harassment Complaints concluded that an "individual failing" by Evans was instrumental in the collapse of the defence to the judicial review action by Salmond. It stated that the major errors were a failure to identify crucial documents early and choosing an investigator who had previous contact with the women complainants. It stated:

The Committee is conscious that the Permanent Secretary's office was identified as coordinating the supply of information for the judicial review and that the Permanent Secretary was one of a few people who had been aware of the prior contact of the Investigating Officer. It must be questioned why the Permanent Secretary in her role and with her knowledge did not ensure that the relevant information was extracted and processed at a much earlier stage. This individual failing is as significant as the general corporate failing already described.

== Personal life ==
Evans is married to Derek McVay, a former member of 1970s Edinburgh punk group The Visitors who became a production manager for the jazz-funk band Jamiroquai. They have one son.

Government offices
Preceded by Peter Housden	Permanent Secretary to the Scottish Government; 2015–2021	Succeeded by John-Paul Marks
