= Permanent Secretary to the Scottish Government =

Top civil servant in Scotland

Scotland Permanent Secretary to the Scottish Government
- Scottish Gaelic: Rùnaire Maireannach Riaghaltas na h-Alba

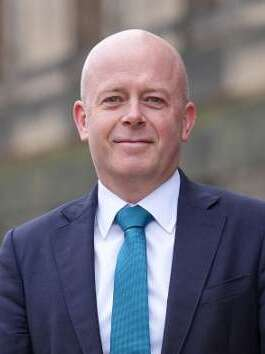
- Incumbent; Joe Griffin since 7 April 2025
- Scottish Government
- Member of: Scottish Cabinet
- Seat: St. Andrew's House, Edinburgh
- Appointer: First Minister of Scotland
- Term length: At the First Minister's pleasure
- Formation: 1998
- First holder: Muir Russell
- Salary: £165,000–£170,000 per annum
- Website: Scottish Government Permanent Secretary

The Permanent Secretary to the Scottish Government (Scottish Gaelic: Rùnaire Maireannach Riaghaltas na h-Alba) is the most senior civil servant in Scotland who leads more than 7,000 staff within the Scottish Government and has oversight of around 125 agencies.

== History ==
The role of permanent secretary originally headed the Office of the Permanent Secretary, which was a civil service department of the Scottish Government (at the time styled as the Scottish Executive). The departments that made up the Scottish Executive were abolished in May 2007. Functions are now delivered by more than 30 separate directorates.

== Overview ==
=== Role ===
The permanent secretary supports the Scottish Government in developing, implementing and communicating its policy agenda. The permanent secretary is the chief official policy adviser to the First Minister of Scotland and acts as secretary during cabinet meetings.

The office holder is additionally responsible for ensuring that the government's money and resources are used effectively and properly. The role is currently occupied by Joe Griffin (civil servant), who was appointed in April 2025 by First Minister John Swinney, with the agreement of the Cabinet Secretary, Sir Chris Wormald.

=== Duties of office ===
The Permanent Secretary to the Scottish Government is directly responsible for 7,000 civil servants in Scotland. The Permanent Secretary leads the Scottish Government civil service department, ensuring the department delivers the full range of devolved powers and duties that the Scottish Parliament has sole responsibility for as outlined in the Scotland Acts of 1998, 2012 and 2016. The office holder is the principal accountable officer for the Scottish Government, and as such they are primarily responsible to the Scottish Parliament for the exercise of the responsibilities held whilst in office. Such responsibilities includes the management of the Scottish Government's budget and the economic, efficient and effective use of Scottish Government resources.

As well as heading a civil service department of 7,000 civil servants, the Permanent Secretary to the Scottish Government supports the development, implementation and communication of all government policies. The Permanent Secretary must be committed to the delivery of the National Performance Framework, which is the countries "outcome-based approach to the implementation of policies aimed at improving the wellbeing and life chances of its citizens, supported by a successful, inclusive economy and a sustainable and healthy environment".

The Permanent Secretary to the Scottish Government liaises with colleagues across the United Kingdom, including the Welsh Government, Northern Ireland Executive and HM Government, in order to support, engage and invest in the talent and leadership of the UK Civil Service as well as wider public services.

=== List of permanent secretaries ===
- Muir Russell (May 1998–July 2003)
- John Elvidge (July 2003–June 2010)
- Peter Housden (June 2010–June 2015)
- Leslie Evans (June 2015–December 2021)
- John-Paul Marks (January 2022–March 2025)
- Joe Griffin (April 2025–present)

== See also ==
- Civil service
- Scottish Government
- Directorates of the Scottish Government
- Permanent Secretary of the Welsh Government
- Head of the Northern Ireland Civil Service
- Cabinet Secretary (United Kingdom)
