= John-Paul Marks =

Permanent Secretary of the Scottish Government

John-Paul Marks CB
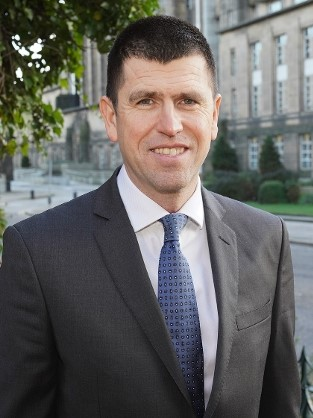
- Official portrait, 2022

Chief Executive of HM Revenue & Customs
- Incumbent
- Assumed office 5 April 2025
- Chancellor: Rachel Reeves; John Healey
- Preceded by: Jim Harra

Permanent Secretary to the Scottish Government
- In office 3 January 2022 – 4 April 2025
- First Minister: Nicola Sturgeon; Humza Yousaf; John Swinney
- Preceded by: Leslie Evans
- Succeeded by: Joe Griffin

Personal details
- Born: 1979 or 1980 (age 45–46) Jersey
- Education: University of Cambridge; Boston University

John-Paul ('JP') Marks CB (born 1979 or 1980) is a British senior civil servant who is currently serving as the Chief Executive of HM Revenue & Customs since 5 April 2025. He previously served as Permanent Secretary to the Scottish Government from 2022 until 2025. From 2019 to 2022, he worked in the UK Government's Department for Work and Pensions, serving as the Director General for Work and Health Services and from 2018 to 2019 he was the Director General for Universal Credit Operations.

== Early life ==
John-Paul Marks was born in Jersey in the Channel Islands. The son of Susan Marks and Dr Michael Marks, he attended the Victoria College. He studied at Cambridge University from 1999 to 2002 and earned a MA in social and political science. He attended Boston University, graduating in 2003 with an MA in international relations.

== Career ==
=== Civil service ===
Marks joined the UK civil service in 2004. In HM Treasury, he served as the Speechwriter to the Chief Secretary to the Treasury. Marks spent much of his career before the Scottish Government at the Department for Work and Pensions, latterly as Director General. He served as Principal Private Secretary to Yvette Cooper and Iain Duncan Smith, and was Private Secretary to Mike O'Brien among other roles.

=== Permanent Secretary; 2022–2025 ===
Marks was appointed as the Permanent Secretary to the Scottish Government on 1 January 2022. At the time of his appointment, Marks was said to be "committed to building a world-class, values-led civil service which excels in serving the public". Upon commencement as Permanent Secretary to the Scottish Government, he assumed the role of leading the Scottish Government civil service, ensuring it delivers the "full range of devolved powers and duties set out in the Scotland Acts". As the principal accountable officer for the Scottish Government, he is primarily responsible and accountable to the Scottish Parliament for the exercise of his responsibilities as Permanent Secretary.

As Permanent Secretary to the Scottish Government, he was responsible for more than 7,000 civil servants working for the Scottish Government in Scotland, as well as other locations including Europe, North America and Asia. As Permanent Secretary, Marks was responsible for the development, implementation and communication of government policies.

In April 2025, Marks was appointed Permanent Secretary and Chief Executive at HM Revenue and Customs.

== Personal life ==
Marks is married with two children. He currently resides in Scotland. He was appointed a Companion of the Order of the Bath (CB) in the 2022 New Year Honours for services to Welfare Reform.

Government offices
Preceded by Leslie Evans	Permanent Secretary to the Scottish Government; 2022–2025	Succeeded by Joe Griffin
