= Joe Griffin (civil servant) =

British civil servant

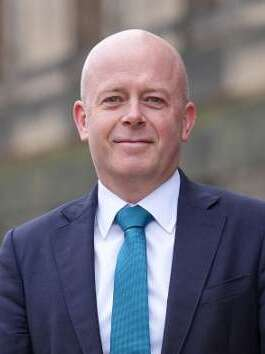
- Official portrait, 2025

Permanent Secretary to the Scottish Government
- Incumbent
- Assumed office 7 April 2025
- First Minister: John Swinney
- Preceded by: John-Paul Marks

Personal details
- Born: Edinburgh, Scotland
- Education: Wadham College, University of Oxford; Vassar College

Joe Griffin is a Scottish civil servant currently serving as the Permanent Secretary to the Scottish Government since 7 April 2025. As Permanent Secretary, Griffin may attend meetings of the Scottish Cabinet, chaired by the First Minister. He has worked with the Scottish Government since 2004, serving as its Director-General for Strategy and External Affairs from 2023 until 2025 and Director-General for Education and Justice from 2021 until 2023.

== Early and personal life ==
Griffin currently resides in Edinburgh with his wife and three children. Griffin began studying for a Bachelor of Arts (BA) degree in Modern History at the University of Oxford in September 1991, and graduated in June 1995.

== Career ==
=== Civil Service career ===
Prior to joining the Scottish Government in 2004, Griffin served as a diplomat at the UK Government Foreign and Commonwealth Office, and was posted to New York and Paris during his time at the Foreign and Commonwealth Office. Following this, Griffin joined the Scottish Government and served in a number of positions including Acting Director for Fair Work, Deputy Director for Creating Positive Futures (Children and Families), Head of Reducing Reoffending and also served as the Principal Private Secretary to the First Minister.

=== Director General positions ===
Griffin previously served as the Director–General for Strategy and External Affairs in the Scottish Government from September 2023 until April 2025. During his time in office, he was directly responsible for leading and supporting the work of the Scottish Government on intergovernmental relations between the Scottish Government and central UK Government, as well as with the Welsh Government and Northern Ireland Executive. He also had an oversight of strategic cross-cutting issues, external affairs, European Union relations, and constitutional issues. In 2021, he was appointed as Director-General for Education and Justice within the Scottish Government, and spearheaded government policy on the expansion of Early Learning and Childcare, increasing free childcare entitlement in Scotland to 1,140 hours per year for all three–five year olds in line with the same number of hours children spend in primary school.

=== Permanent Secretary ===
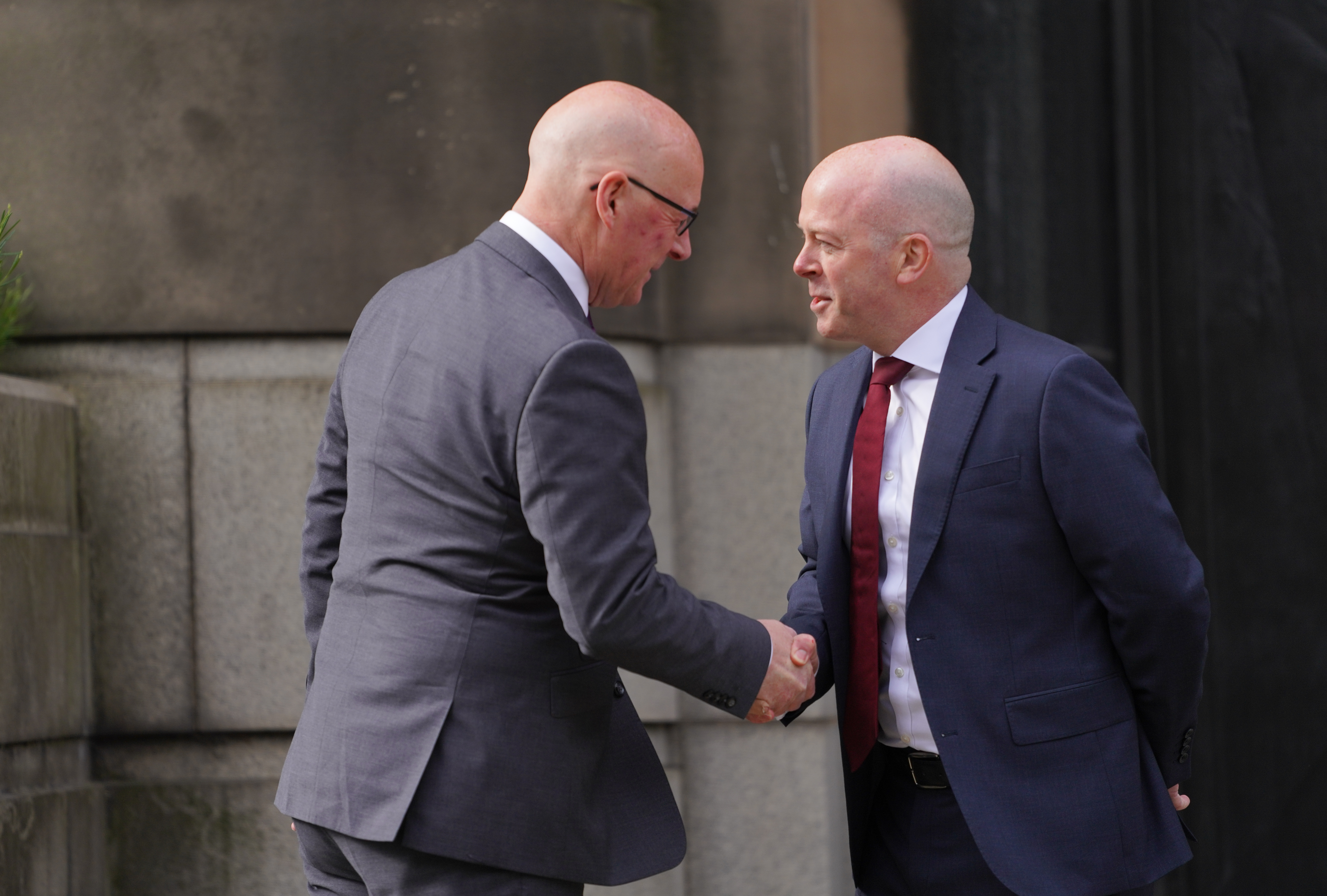
Griffin (right) with First Minister John Swinney, 11 May 2026

In April 2025, Griffin was appointed as Permanent Secretary to the Scottish Government following the appointment of the previous incumbent, John-Paul Marks, as Permanent Secretary and Chief Executive of HM Revenue and Customs (HMRC). His appointment was recommended by First Minister of Scotland, John Swinney, and was formally announced by Sir Chris Wormald and first civil service commissioner Gisela Stuart on the advice of John Swinney. On the departure of Marks from the position of Permanent Secretary, Swinney praised him for his "devoted public service and leadership of the Civil Service", saying that his "Cabinet and I are grateful for the invaluable advice he has provided during his time at the Scottish Government".

On the appointment of Griffin to succeeded Marks as Permanent Secretary, Swinney "welcomed" his appointment as Permanent Secretary of the Scottish Government, highlighting that Griffin "brings a wealth of experience to this role from his distinguished career in the Civil Service", further adding "I know from his record of delivery, not least on the massive expansion of early learning and childcare that he led, that Joe will deliver an unyielding focus on delivering for the people of Scotland".

Following his appointment to the position, Griffin said it was a "privilege to be appointed Permanent Secretary and lead the Civil Service in the Scottish Government" and indicated that his priorities as Permanent Secretary would include "driving progress and deliver the government’s four priorities; eradicating child poverty, growing the economy, tackling the climate emergency, and ensuring high quality and sustainable public services".
