= Roger Cohn =

American journalist and magazine editor

- Born: United States
- Education: Yale University
- Organisation: Yale Environment 360
- Known for: Environmental journalism

Roger Cohn is an American journalist. He is the founder and editor of Yale Environment 360, an online environmental magazine published at the Yale School of the Environment. Previously he served as the executive editor of Audubon and editor-in-chief of Mother Jones, which won a National Magazine Award for general excellence during his tenure.

Cohn has written for publications including The New York Times Magazine, The Washington Post, and Outside and served as a lecturer at the Graduate School of Journalism at the University of California, Berkeley.

== Education and career ==
Roger Cohn attended Yale University, graduating in 1973. From 1977 to 1987, he was a reporter at the Philadelphia Inquirer, where he covered environment and urban affairs. In 1980, he was part of a team of journalists that won the Pulitzer Prize for News Reporting for their coverage of the Three Mile Island nuclear accident.

From 1991 to 1998, Cohn was executive editor at Audubon, helping to lead the magazine during a period when it became known for its environmental reporting. In 1999, he took over as editor-in-chief of Mother Jones, refocusing the magazine on in-depth investigative journalism. Under his leadership, Mother Jones increased its circulation from 132,000 to 236,000 and won a National Magazine Award for general excellence. Cohn resigned from his post in 2005.

In 2007, James Gustave Speth, then dean of the Yale School of Forestry & Environmental Studies, recruited Cohn to helm a new online environmental magazine. “We wanted to do a serious job of reporting on a broad range of environmental issues and science,” Cohn said. “It was a niche that was not being served, something in between an academic journal and a green publication on lifestyle issues.”

In June 2008, Cohn launched Yale Environment 360 with articles by Bill McKibben, Elizabeth Kolbert, Fred Pearce, and Carl Zimmer. Yale E360 has since won an Online Journalism Award for best specialty journalism site and a National Magazine Award for best video in digital media. "The Warriors of Qiugang," a short film co-produced byYale E360 was nominated for an Academy Award for Best Documentary (Short Subject) at the 83rd Academy Awards.
