= Keith Kloor =

American journalist

- Education: SUNY Empire State
- Occupations: Writer and editor
- Website: www.keithkloor.com

Keith Kloor is an American freelance writer and journalism professor. He teaches magazine article writing as an adjunct lecturer for the Arthur L. Carter journalism institute at New York University, as well as Urban Environmental Reporting at the CUNY Graduate School of Journalism and is a former fellow of the Center for Environmental Journalism. He lives in Brooklyn, New York.

== Career ==
Kloor is an adjunct professor of journalism at the CUNY Graduate School of Journalism, Stevens Institute of Technology, and the New York University Arthur L. Carter Journalism Institute.

From 2000 to 2008, he was an editor at Audubon Magazine. From 2008 to 2009, he was a Fellow at the University of Colorado's Center for Environmental Journalism. From 2013 to 2014, Kloor served as a Senior Editor for Cosmos magazine.

From early 2009 until April 15, 2015, Kloor wrote a blog entitled Collide-a-Scape for Discover magazine.

Kloor has written for Nature, Science and for the Archaeological Institute of America. Other major publication credits include: Smithsonian magazine, Science, The Washington Post magazine, Archaeology, Backpacker, Issues in Science and Technology, High Country News, Mother Jones, Cosmos, Slate, Yale Environment 360, Yale Forum on Climate Change & the Media, Climate Central, and Bloomberg Business.

== Bibliography ==
- Kloor, Keith (January 28, 2000). "Returning America's forests to their 'natural' roots". Restoration Ecology. Science. 287 (5453): 573–575. doi:10.1126/science.287.5453.573. PMID 10691535. S2CID 36955669.
- — (December 7, 2007). "The vanishing Fremont". Science. 318 (5856): 1540–1543. doi:10.1126/science.318.5856.1540. PMID 18063765. S2CID 128780295.
- — (Feb–Mar 2014). "A new look at the paleo diet". Digest. Cosmos. 55: 17.
- — (Feb–Mar 2014). "Collapse of the Easter Island theory". Digest. Cosmos. 55: 22.
- Mitchell, James Crow; Kloor, Keith (Feb–Mar 2014). "Food facts : how does the world feed itself now and in the future? [Infographic]". Special Feature. Food Wars. Cosmos. 55: 52–53.
- Kloor, Keith (Feb–Mar 2014). "Speak of the Devil : how did biotech giant Monsanto come to personify evil?". Special Feature. Food Wars. Cosmos. 55: 74–79.
