= Yale Environment 360 =

American online magazine

- Website type: Online magazine
- Available in: English
- Headquarters: New Haven, Connecticut
- Editor: Roger Cohn
- Website: e360.yale.edu
- Commercial: No
- Launched: June 3, 2008
- Current status: Active

Yale Environment 360 (abbreviated as Yale E360 or e360) is an American online magazine focused on environmental journalism. It includes original reporting, opinion, analysis, and interviews. Yale Environment 360 is published by the Yale School of the Environment at Yale University, but it is editorially independent.

== History ==
James Gustave Speth, then dean of the Yale School of Forestry & Environmental Studies, first proposed the idea of a Yale-sponsored environmental website in 2007. Roger Cohn, formerly the editor-in-chief of Mother Jones and executive editor of Audubon, was hired to be e360's editor. Cohn described his vision for e360 at the time as "a publication that straddles the line between more academic and specialized environmental sites and more general green lifestyle sites."

Yale E360 officially launched on June 3, 2008 with articles by Bill McKibben, Elizabeth Kolbert, Fred Pearce, and Carl Zimmer. The website was redesigned in 2017.

== Funders and partnerships ==
Yale Environment 360 is funded using a non-profit journalism model by private foundations and donors. Major donors include the BAND Foundation, the William Penn Foundation, the Heinz Endowments, and the Climate and Land Use Alliance.

The magazine is part of Climate Desk, a journalistic collaboration between Yale Environment 360, Wired, Mother Jones, Slate, and others.

== Awards and accolades ==
"Leveling Appalachia," a video produced by e360, was awarded best video at the 2010 National Magazine Awards. It was the first video ever to receive a National Magazine Award. Yale E360 was also honored by the Online News Association in 2009, 2010, and 2011, and has received multiple Webby Award nominations.

The Warriors of Qiugang, a short film directed by Ruby Yang and produced by Thomas Lennon, was co-produced and hosted by Yale E360. It was nominated for an Academy Award for Best Documentary (Short Subject) at the 83rd Academy Awards.

== See also ==
- Institute for Nonprofit News (member)
