= Edward Wegman =

American statistician

Academic background
- Education: Saint Louis University (B.S. 1965); University of Iowa (Ph.D. 1968)

Academic work
- Discipline: Statistics
- Institutions: George Mason University

Edward Wegman is an American statistician and was a professor of statistics at George Mason University (GMU) until his retirement in 2018. He holds a Ph.D. in mathematical statistics and is a Fellow of the American Statistical Association, a Senior Member of the IEEE, and past chair of the National Research Council Committee on Applied and Theoretical Statistics. In addition to his work in the field of statistical computing, Wegman contributed a report to a Congressional hearing on climate change at the request of Republican Rep. Joe Barton. Wegman's report supported criticisms of the methodology of two specific paleoclimate studies into the temperature record of the past 1000 years, and argued that climate scientists were excessively isolated from the statistical mainstream. Subsequently, significant portions of Wegman's report were found to have been copied without attribution from a variety of sources, including Wikipedia, and a publication based on the report was retracted.

== Career ==
Wegman, a St. Louis, Missouri native, received a B.S. in mathematics from Saint Louis University in 1965. He then went to graduate school at the University of Iowa, where he earned an M.S. in 1967 and a Ph.D. in 1968, both in mathematical statistics. He held a faculty position at the University of North Carolina for ten years. In 1978, Wegman joined the Office of Naval Research, in which he headed the Mathematical Sciences Division. Later, Wegman served as the first program director of the Ultra High Speed Computing basic research program for the Strategic Defense Initiative's Innovative Science and Technology Office. He joined the faculty of George Mason University in 1986 and developed a master's degree program in statistical science. He retired from his position at George Mason University in 2018.

Wegman is credited with coining the phrase "computational statistics" and developing a high-profile research program around the concept that computing resources could transform statistical techniques. He also has been the associate editor of seven academic journals, a member of numerous editorial boards, and the author of more than 160 papers and five books. Wegman is a member of the American Statistical Association, a former president of the International Association for Statistical Computing, and a past chairman of the Committee on Applied and Theoretical Statistics for the United States National Academy of Sciences. Wegman received the 2002 American Statistical Association Founders Award for "over thirty years of exceptional service and leadership to the American Statistical Association."

== Energy and Commerce hearing & plagiarism ==
In 2006, Republican Congressman Joe Barton chose Wegman to assist the House Energy and Commerce Committee in its inquiry criticizing the multi-proxy paleoclimate reconstructions which had been dubbed the "hockey stick graph". Wegman produced a report and offered testimony supporting published papers disputing the methodology and data used by the climate scientists. The legitimacy of this investigation was disputed, and Sherwood Boehlert as chairman of the United States House Committee on Science, Space and Technology arranged for an investigation by the National Research Council, the North Report which found that the Wegman committee's conclusions lacked substance.

In October 2010, George Mason University announced they were conducting a formal investigation into charges of plagiarism and misconduct related to the Wegman Report. In November 2010, USA Today reported that the "review of the 91-page report, by three experts... found repeated instances of passages lifted word for word and what appear to be thinly disguised paraphrases" of wording taken from the textbook Paleoclimatology: Reconstructing Climates of the Quaternary, as well as erroneous citations of data. Wegman criticized the "speculation and conspiracy theory" in the original allegations, and said that "these attacks are unprecedented" in his long career. A Nature editorial in May 2011 called the delays in GMU's inquiry "disheartening," as "long misconduct investigations do not serve anyone, except perhaps university public-relations departments that might hope everyone will have forgotten about a case by the time it wraps up," and urged resolution "as speedily as possible while allowing time for due process."

In May 2011 the journal Computational Statistics and Data Analysis retracted a 2008 social network analysis based on the Wegman Report by Yasmin Said, Wegman, and others, because the paper used portions of other authors' writings without sufficient attribution. The lawyer for both authors said they stood by their work. Subsequently, USA Today reported additional concerns about separate 2009 review article authored by Wegman and Said which contained material copied without attribution from Wikipedia. Wegman, his attorney, and George Mason University declined to comment on the allegations.

Ultimately, an investigation by George Mason University was completed in February 2012. The investigation found that regarding the Congressional Wegman Report, "no misconduct was involved"; while "extensive paraphrasing of another work did occur, in a background section... the work was repeatedly referenced and the committee found that the paraphrasing did not constitute misconduct". A separate university committee examining Said & Wegman's 2008 publication, based on the Wegman report, found "that plagiarism occurred in contextual sections of the article, as a result of poor judgment for which Professor Wegman, as team leader, must bear responsibility." The university's reports were not made public, but it was announced that Wegman was to receive an "official letter of reprimand" as a consequence. The decision was decried by Raymond S. Bradley, one of the scientists whose work had been copied without attribution by Said & Wegman; Bradley argued that the findings would encourage GMU students to think it acceptable to copy work without attribution.
