= Eric Steig =

Canadian-American glaciologist

- Education: University of Washington
- Alma mater: Hampshire College
- Scientific career
- Fields: Geochemistry; Glaciology; Climatology; Paleoclimatology
- Workplaces: University of Washington, University of Edinburgh, University of Copenhagen, University of Colorado, University of Pennsylvania
- Thesis: Beryllium-10 in the Taylor Dome Ice Core: Applications to Antarctic glaciology and paleoclimatology (1996)
- Doctoral advisor: Minze Stuiver
- Other academic advisors: Stephen C. Porter, Pieter M. Grootes, Edwin D. Waddington, Alan R. Gillespie

Eric Steig is a Canadian-American scientist specializing in polar climate, glaciology, isotope geochemistry, and ice core science.

Steig is the Ben Rabinowitz Professor of Earth and Space Sciences at the University of Washington. He is also adjunct professor in the Department of Atmospheric Sciences.

Steig served as Chair of the University of Washington's Department of Earth and Space Sciences from 2020 to 2024 and Director of the Quaternary Research Center from 2008 to 2014.

He has published more than 175 peer-reviewed scientific papers on topics including ice-core analysis, polar climate variability, and ice-sheet history. He is best known for his work on climate change in Antarctica and its influence on the stability of the Antarctic ice sheet, and for research in the British Columbia Coast Range mountains. He is also known for development of novel methods in laser spectroscopy, including the analysis of the rare oxygen-17 isotope in water.

He was Senior Editor of the journal Quaternary Research from 2004 to 2008, and a member of the Board of Reviewing Editors for Science (journal) from 2013 to 2018.

Steig was one of the founding contributors to RealClimate, the first prominent blog about climate science written by scientists, which was founded "to provide responses to and context for press coverage of climate research". He was elected a Fellow of the American Association for the Advancement of Science in 2019, in part for this "early innovation in science communication". He has also been recognized as a National Academy of Sciences Kavli Fellow.

In 2023, he was elected a Fellow of the American Geophysical Union "for numerous fundamental contributions in ice core, paleoclimate, and climate dynamics research". He was awarded a Guggenheim Fellowship in 2024. He is an elected member of the Washington State Academy of Sciences.
