= William Connolley =

Software engineer, climatologist, writer, blogger (born 1964)

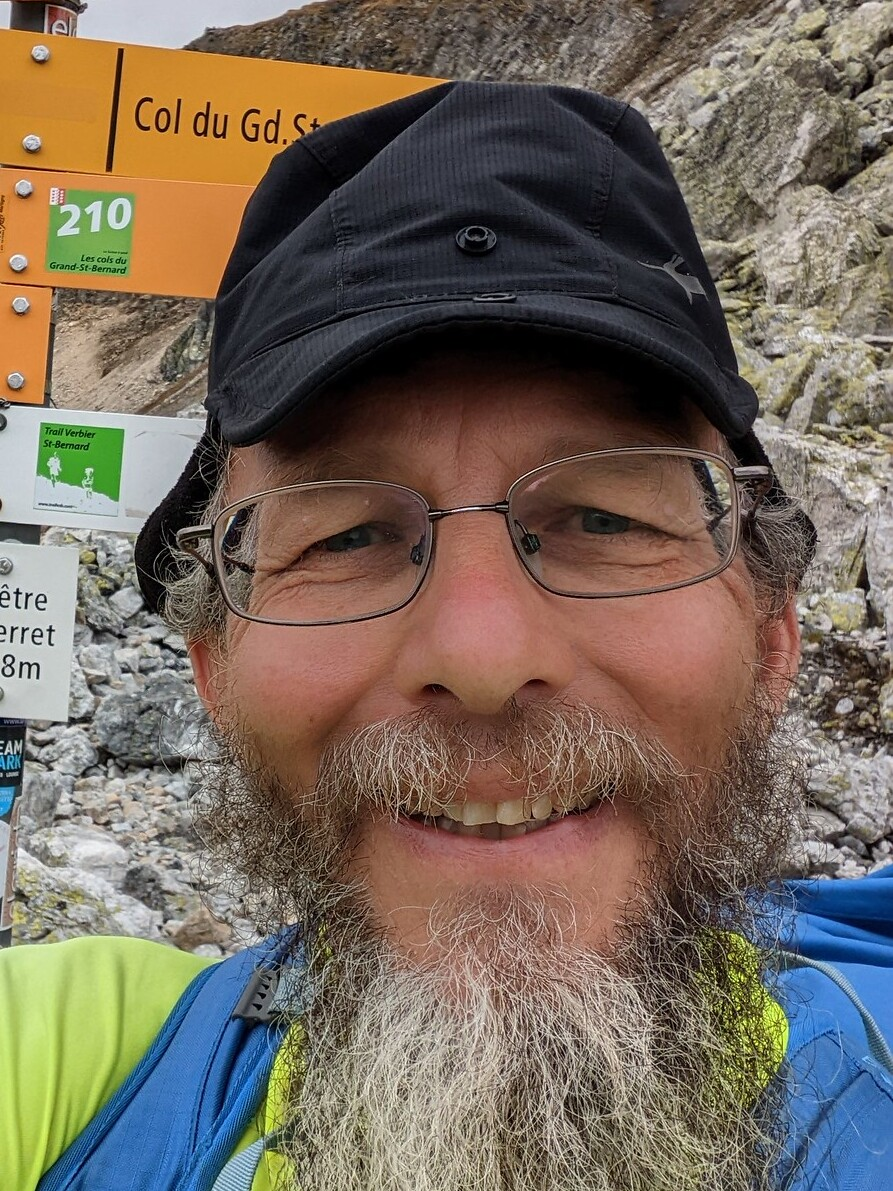
- Connolley in May 2022
- Born: William Michael Conolley; 12 April 1964 (age 62)
- Education: University of Oxford
- Occupations: Software engineer; writer; blogger; Wikipedian
- Years active: 2003–present
- Known for: Blog activity about climate change
- Political party: Green Party of England and Wales
- Children: 2
- Website: www.wmconnolley.org.uk

William Michael Connolley (born 12 April 1964) is a retired British software engineer, writer, and blogger on climatology. Until December 2007 he was Senior Scientific Officer in the Physical Sciences Division in the Antarctic Climate and the Earth System project at the British Antarctic Survey, where he worked as a climate modeller. After that he became a software engineer for Cambridge Silicon Radio.

Connolley received national press attention over several years for his involvement in editing Wikipedia articles relating to climate change. Connolley was a member of the RealClimate website until 2007 and now operates a website and blog that discuss climate issues. He has also been active in local politics as a member of the Green Party.

== Background ==
Connolley holds an undergraduate degree in mathematics and a DPhil from St Edmund Hall at the University of Oxford for his work on numerical analysis. He works as a software engineer for Cambridge Silicon Radio, designing embedded firmware.

Until December 2007, Connolley was Senior Scientific Officer in the Physical Sciences Division in the Antarctic Climate and the Earth System project at the British Antarctic Survey. His research focused on sea ice measurement and modelling, including the HadCM3 global climate model (GCM). Connolley also worked on the validation of satellite data against more direct upward looking sonar observations in the Weddell Sea area. He concluded that Bootstrap data produced a better fit than data produced by NASA and that GCM predictions are more realistic than previously thought.

Connolley served as a parish councillor in the village of Coton (near Cambridge, England) until May 2007. He was also a Green Party candidate for South Cambridgeshire District Council and Cambridgeshire County Council.

== Writing and editing ==
Connolley has authored and co-authored articles and literature reviews in the field of climatological research, with an emphasis on the climate of the Antarctic and the study of sea ice. Connolley was a member of the RealClimate website until 2007, and he operates a website and blog that discuss climate issues. His blogs and one of his papers conclude that a majority of scientific papers in the 1970s predicted warming, not global cooling. The Christian Science Monitor noted in 2007 that on Connolley's "personal website, and as a contributor to RealClimate.org (a website written and edited by working climate scientists), he's authored a number of articles that try to clarify the place of global cooling in the history of science" and commented, "Connolley and Schneider say that if the public had looked directly at the peer-reviewed scientific papers, and not at the popular media coverage, they would not have found any basis for a global-cooling scare."

=== Wikipedia editing ===
Connolley began editing Wikipedia in 2003 and served as a Wikipedia administrator from 2006 until 2009. He has been cited and quoted in the media regarding these activities, especially with respect to his editing in the area of climate change. He was cited by Nature magazine, in their December 2005 review of the reliability of Wikipedia, as an example of an expert who edits Wikipedia. Nature quoted Connolley, in 2006, as saying that "some scientists have become frustrated with Wikipedia" but that "conflict can sometimes result in better articles".

==== No weight given to subject matter experts ====
In July 2006, a New Yorker article described him as briefly becoming "a victim of an edit war over the entry on global warming", in which a sceptic repeatedly "watered down" the article's explanation of the greenhouse effect. Connolley told the magazine that Wikipedia "gives no privilege to those who know what they're talking about". Various books have cited Connolley as an example of how expert editors on Wikipedia are given "no more credence" than anonymous editors of the site. In 2007, The Sunday Times of London ran an interview of author Andrew Keen that discussed Connolley and his Wikipedia editing. It identified Connolley as "an expert on global warming", stating: "After trying to correct inaccuracies Connolley was accused of trying to remove 'any point of view which does not match his own'. Eventually he was limited to making just one edit a day." The article stated that Wikipedia's Arbitration Committee "gave no weight to [Connolley's] expertise, and treated him with the same credibility as his anonymous opponent."

==== Alleged abuse of administrative privileges ====
Two internal disputes at Wikipedia in which Connolley was involved received additional attention. A 2005 Wikipedia climate change dispute involving breaches of etiquette, rather than content bias, was cited by a paper in the Journal of Science Communication as an example that "resonated deeply as it highlighted what can befall respected experts who wade into controversial wiki-waters". The paper stated that Connolley did "not suffer...fools gladly".

The same paper noted a 2009 Wikipedia arbitration in which it was concluded that Connolley had used administrator privileges to his own advantage in content disputes, and these privileges were removed. Other academic papers have discussed Connolley's editing activities on Wikipedia and the dispute resolution process as it has been applied to him.

== Personal life ==
Connolley has two children.

== Selected publications ==
- Connolley, W. M.; Harangozo, S. A. (2001). "A comparison of five numerical weather prediction analysis climatologies in southern high latitudes" (PDF). Journal of Climate. 14 (1): 30–44. Bibcode:2001JCli...14...30C. doi:10.1175/1520-0442(2001)014<0030:ACOFNW>2.0.CO;2. S2CID 129714448.
- Turner, J.; Connolley, W. M.; Cresswell, D.; Harangozo, S. A. (2001). "The simulation of Antarctic sea ice in the Hadley Centre climate model (HadCM3)". Annals of Glaciology. 33: 585–591. Bibcode:2001AnGla..33..585T. doi:10.3189/172756401781818095.
- Vaughan, D. G.; Marshall, G. J.; Connolley, W. M.; King, J. C.; Mulvaney, R. (2001). "Climate Change – Devil in the Detail". Science. 293 (5536): 1777–1779. doi:10.1126/science.1065116. PMID 11546858. S2CID 129175116.
- Lachlan-Cope, T. A.; Connolley, W. M.; Turner, J. (2001). "The Role of the Non-Axisymmetric Antarctic Orography in Forcing the Observed Pattern of Variability of the Antarctic Climate". Geophysical Research Letters. 28 (21): 4111–4114. Bibcode:2001GeoRL..28.4111L. doi:10.1029/2001GL013465.
- Connolley, W. M. (2002). "Long-term variation of the Antarctic Circumpolar Wave". Journal of Geophysical Research. 108 (C4): 8076. Bibcode:2002JGRC..107.8076C. doi:10.1029/2000JC000380.
- Turner, J.; Harangozo, S. A.; King, J. C.; Connolley, W.; Lachlan‐Cope, T.; Marshall, G. J. (2003). "An exceptional winter sea ice retreat/advance in the Bellingshausen Sea, Antarctica". Atmosphere-Ocean. 41 (2): 171–185. Bibcode:2003AtO....41..171T. doi:10.3137/ao.410205.
- Vaughan, D. G.; Marshall, G. J.; Connolley, W. M.; Parkinson, C.; Mulvaney, R.; Hodgson, D. A.; King, J. C.; Pudsey, C. J.; Turner, J. (2003). "Recent Rapid Regional Climate Warming on the Antarctic Peninsula". Climatic Change. 60 (3): 243–274. doi:10.1023/A:1026021217991. S2CID 154732764.
- Translation of Fourier 1827: Mémoire sur les temperatures du globe terrestre et des espaces planetaires
- Connolley, W. M.; Gregory, J. M.; Hunke, E.; McLaren, A. J. (2004). "On the Consistent Scaling of Terms in the Sea-Ice Dynamics Equation". Journal of Physical Oceanography. 34 (7): 1776–1780. Bibcode:2004JPO....34.1776C. doi:10.1175/1520-0485(2004)034<1776:OTCSOT>2.0.CO;2.
- Marshall, G. J.; Stott, P. A.; Turner, J.; Connolley, W. M.; King, J. C.; Lachlan-Cope, T. A. (2004). "Causes of exceptional atmospheric circulation changes in the Southern Hemisphere". Geophysical Research Letters. 31 (14): L14205. Bibcode:2004GeoRL..3114205M. doi:10.1029/2004GL019952.
- King, J. C.; Turner, J.; Marshall, G. J.; Connolley, W. M.; Lachlan-Cope, T. A. (2003). "Antarctic Peninsula climate variability and its causes as revealed by analysis of instrumental records". In Domack, E. (ed.). Antarctic Peninsula Climate Variability: Historical and Paleoenvironmental Perspectives. Antarctic Research Series. Vol. 79. pp. 17–29. doi:10.1029/AR079p0017. ISBN 978-0-87590-973-8.
- Connolley, W. M. (2005). "Sea ice concentrations in the Weddell Sea: A comparison of SSM/I, ULS, and GCM data" (PDF). Geophysical Research Letters. 32 (7): L07501. Bibcode:2005GeoRL..32.7501C. doi:10.1029/2004GL021898.
  - See also Sea ice: What I do in my spare time for a popular exposition.
- Peterson, T. C.; Connolley, W. M.; Fleck, J. (2008). "The Myth of the 1970s Global Cooling Scientific Consensus" (PDF). Bulletin of the American Meteorological Society. 89 (9): 1325–1337. Bibcode:2008BAMS...89.1325P. doi:10.1175/2008BAMS2370.1. S2CID 123635044.

== See also ==
- List of Wikipedia people
