= Stefan Rahmstorf =

German oceanographer & climatologist (b.1960)

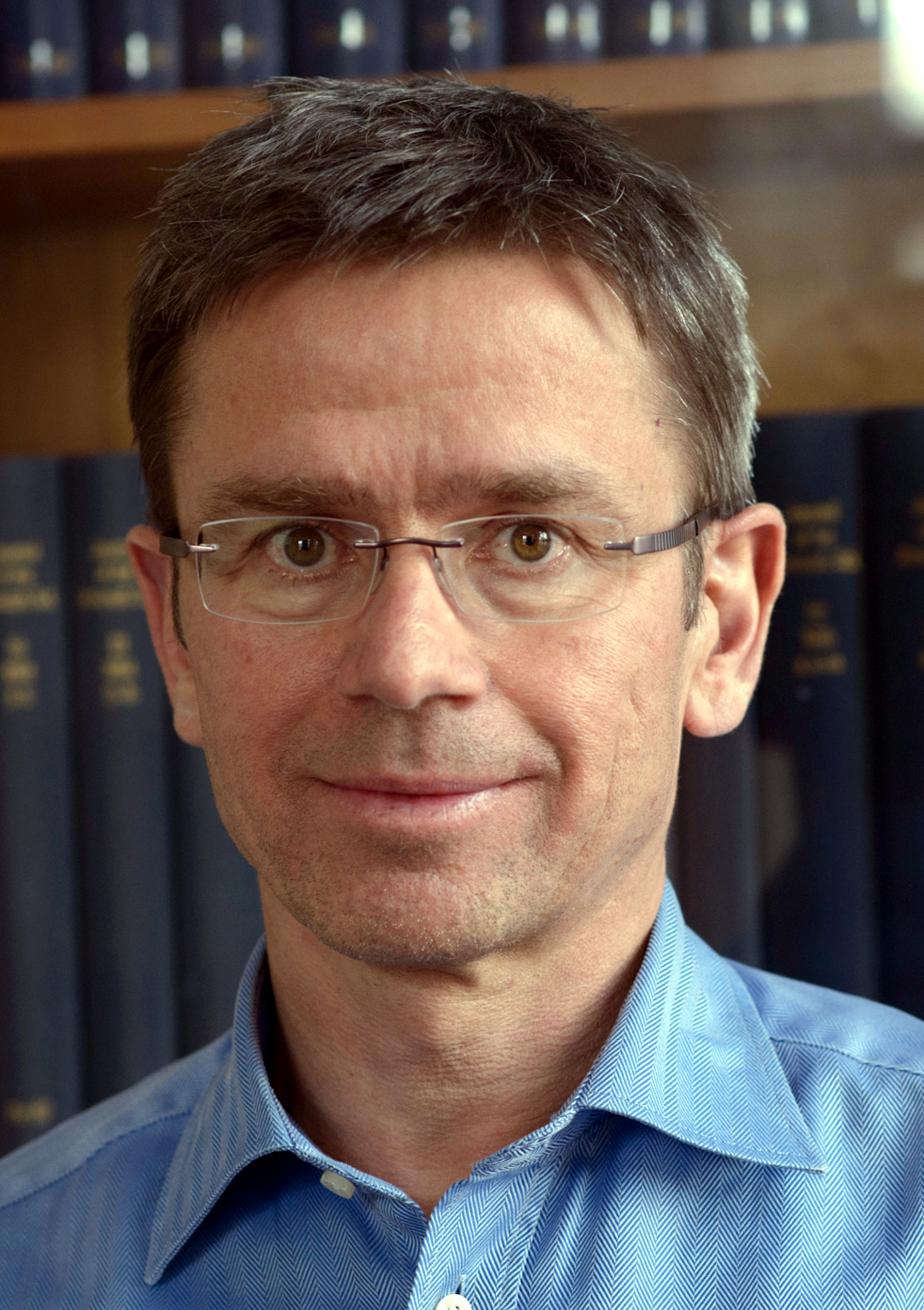
- Rahmstorf in 2013
- Born: 22 February 1960 (age 66); Karlsruhe, Germany
- Education: Bangor University; Victoria University of Wellington
- Scientific career
- Fields: Oceanography
- Workplaces: Potsdam University
- Thesis: An oceanic mixing model : application to global climate and to the New Zealand West Coast (1990)

Stefan Rahmstorf (born 22 February 1960) is a German oceanographer and climatologist. Since 2000, he has been a Professor of Physics of the Oceans at Potsdam University. He studied physical oceanography at Bangor University and received his Ph.D. in oceanography from Victoria University of Wellington (1990). His work focuses on the role of ocean currents in climate change. He was one of the lead authors of the IPCC Fourth Assessment Report.

== Public role ==
Rahmstorf is a co-founder of the blog RealClimate, which has been described by Nature as one of the top-5 science blogs in 2006, and included among the 15 best environmental websites by Time in 2008. He also co-founded the German blog KlimaLounge. KlimaLounge won the 3rd prize of the science blog award of 2013. He is a frequent contributor of articles on climate and climate change/global warming in the popular press, some of which are internationally syndicated via Project Syndicate. He writes a regular column in the German environmental magazine Zeo2, and has published the children's science book Wolken, Wind und Wetter (Clouds, Wind, and Weather) on weather and climate. The book was selected as Environmental Book of the Month for January 2012 by the Deutsche Umweltstiftung. In addition, it was later voted Environmental Book of the Year 2012.

Rahmstorf has commented on climate change and climate policy on TV and radio. He was portrayed as one of the world's 10 leading climate scientists by the Financial Times in 2009. The ARD presented a portrait of Rahmstorf in their prime news magazine Tagesthemen when he received the Deutscher Umweltmedienpreis (German Environmental Media Award) in 2007.

== Work ==
The University of Flensburg found that among all climate scientists from Germany, Rahmstorf published the largest number of studies which ranked amongst the most-cited in the scientific literature during the years 1994–2013. Rahmstorf was a member of the German Advisory Council on Global Change (WBGU) from 2004 till 2013.

== Awards and honors ==
- Alfred Wegener Medal, 2024, awarded by the European Geosciences Union to honour a scientist who has achieved exceptional international standing in atmospheric, hydrological or ocean sciences
- Climate Communication Prize of the American Geophysical Union (2017).
- Fellow of the American Geophysical Union (2010)
- Along with other authors of the IPCC AR4 report, he was honored by the award of the 2007 Nobel Peace Prize to the IPCC, shared with Al Gore.
- Honorary Fellow of the University of Wales (2007)
- German Environmental Media Award (Deutscher Umweltmedienpreis), for his work on scientific accurate reporting anthropogenic climate change and impacts (2007)
- Centennial Fellowship Award from the James S. McDonnell Foundation, research grant of $1 million (1999)

== Selected publications ==
An overview of Rahmstorf's publications can be found at his Google Scholar profile.

- Rahmstorf, S.; et al. (2015). "Exceptional twentieth-century slowdown in Atlantic Ocean overturning circulation" (PDF). Nature Climate Change. 5 (5): 475–480. Bibcode:2015NatCC...5..475R. doi:10.1038/nclimate2554.
- Rahmstorf, S., Zickfeld, K. (2005). "Thermohaline circulation changes: a question of risk assessment". Climatic Change. 68 (1–2): 241–7. Bibcode:2005ClCh...68..241R. doi:10.1007/s10584-005-4038-0. S2CID 155961343.
- Rahmstorf, S.; et al. (2004). "Cosmic rays, carbon dioxide and climate". Eos. 85 (4): 38, 41. Bibcode:2004EOSTr..85...38R. doi:10.1029/2004EO040002.
- Zickfeld, K., Slawig, T., Rahmstorf, S. (2004). "A low-order model for the response of the Atlantic thermohaline circulation to climate change". Ocean Dynamics. 54 (1): 8–26. Bibcode:2004OcDyn..54....8Z. doi:10.1007/s10236-003-0054-7. S2CID 16118901.
- Rahmstorf, S. (2003). "Timing of abrupt climate change: a precise clock". Geophys. Res. Lett. 30 (10) 2003GL017115: 1510. Bibcode:2003GeoRL..30.1510R. doi:10.1029/2003GL017115. S2CID 15218839.
- Rahmstorf, S. (2003). "Thermohaline circulation: The current climate". Nature. 421 (6924): 699. Bibcode:2003Natur.421..699R. doi:10.1038/421699a. PMID 12610602. S2CID 4414604.
- Rahmstorf, S. (2002). "Ocean circulation and climate during the past 120,000 years". Nature. 419 (6903): 207–214. Bibcode:2002Natur.419..207R. doi:10.1038/nature01090. PMID 12226675. S2CID 3136307.
- Ganopolski, A., Rahmstorf, S. (2002). "Abrupt glacial climate changes due to stochastic resonance". Phys. Rev. Lett. 88 (3) 038501. Bibcode:2002PhRvL..88c8501G. doi:10.1103/PhysRevLett.88.038501. PMID 11801092.
- Rahmstorf, S., Alley, R.B. (2002). "Stochastic resonance in glacial climate". Eos. 83 (12): 129–135. Bibcode:2002EOSTr..83..129R. doi:10.1029/2002EO000078.
- Ganopolski, A., Rahmstorf, S. (2001). "Simulation of rapid glacial climate changes in a coupled climate model". Nature. 409 (6817): 153–8. Bibcode:2001Natur.409..153G. doi:10.1038/35051500. PMID 11196631. S2CID 4304701.
- Rahmstorf, S. (1999). "Shifting seas in the greenhouse?". Nature. 399 (6736): 523–4. Bibcode:1999Natur.399..523R. doi:10.1038/21066. S2CID 4424509.
- Ganopolski, A., Rahmstorf, S., Petoukhov, V., Claussen, M. (1998). "Simulation of modern and glacial climates with a coupled global climate model". Nature. 391 (6665): 351–6. Bibcode:1998Natur.391..351G. doi:10.1038/34839. S2CID 4384039.
- Rahmstorf, S. (1997). "Risk of sea-change in the Atlantic". Nature. 388 (6645): 825–6. Bibcode:1997Natur.388..825R. doi:10.1038/42127. S2CID 205030058.
- Rahmstorf, S. (1995). "Bifurcations of the Atlantic thermohaline circulation in response to changes in the hydrological cycle". Nature. 378 (6553): 145–9. Bibcode:1995Natur.378..145R. doi:10.1038/378145a0. S2CID 4359657.
- Rahmstorf, S. (1994). "Rapid climate transitions in a coupled ocean-atmosphere model". Nature. 372 (6501): 82–5. Bibcode:1994Natur.372...82R. doi:10.1038/372082a0. S2CID 4356661.
