= Association of British Science Writers =

British society for science writers

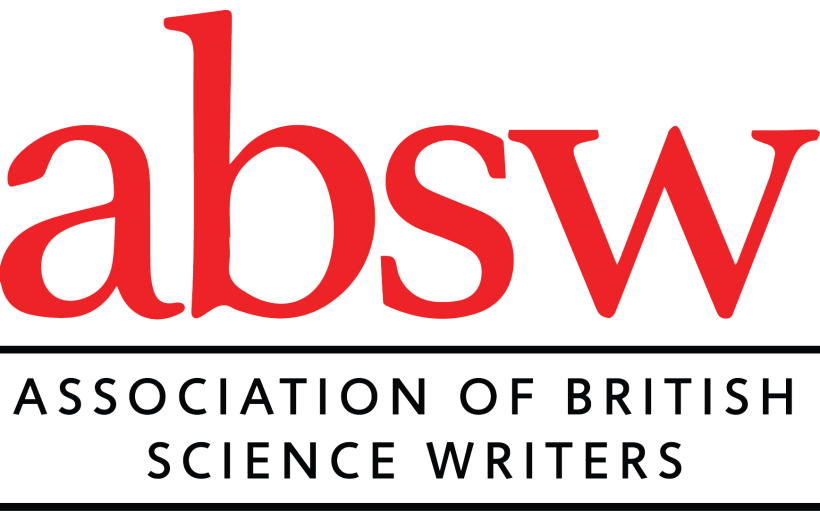
The ABSW logo.

The Association of British Science Writers (ABSW) is the UK society for science writers, science journalists and science communicators. Founded in 1947, the ABSW exists to help those who write about science and technology, and to improve the standard of science journalism in the UK.

== Membership ==
There are three grades of membership, not including Life Membership, an honorary grade awarded at the discretion of the committee.

=== Ordinary members ===
Open to people whose principal employment is science writing and/or broadcasting. Ordinary membership is not open to those chiefly occupied in public relations. Current annual subscription is £40.

=== Associate members ===
Open to those whose work advances the public awareness of science and technology, but who do not qualify as ordinary members. Associate members do not have voting rights. Current annual subscription is £36.

=== Student members ===
Open to anyone in full or part-time education directed towards advancing the public engagement in science and technology. Student members, who have no voting rights, are to progress to ordinary or associate membership if, on completion of their course, they embark on an appropriate career. Current annual subscription is £20.

== Careers ==
The ABSW provides careers advice to aspiring science writers, in the form of a helpful, recently updated booklet, "Science Writing: the basics". The ABSW also provides networking and skills events as well as a mentoring service for members.

== Awards ==
The association administers the annual ABSW Science Writing Awards for Great Britain and Ireland.

Sponsored by Johnson & Johnson Innovation since 2011, the awards seek to set standards of excellence in science writing across many categories. The awards, £1,000 each, presented to the writers and broadcasters who have, in the opinion of an independent panel of judges, produced the best science journalism each year, that highlights important issues accurately and with bravery and flair. These awards, the world's oldest established awards for science writing, have now been running for 50 years.

== Student bursaries ==
For some years, the ABSW managed a scheme of Bursaries, funded by the Wellcome Trust, to identify and train the science communicators of the future. Every year, seven bursaries are available for full-time and two for part-time study.

== Events and conferences ==
The association puts on regular events and training days for members. It also runs the biennial UK Conference of Science Journalists. This alternates with a biennial Science Journalism Summer School for those wishing to enter the field.

== Affiliations ==
The ABSW is a member of the World Federation of Science Journalists, as well as the UK's Creators' Rights Alliance.

== Controversy ==
Sir Colin Blakemore resigned as Honorary President of the ABSW in 2015 due to his frustration: '...by the decision of the Association of British Science Writers... to continue to give unconditional support to [journalist] Connie St Louis, who first claimed [Sir Tim Hunt ]...had made sexist remarks.'
