= RealClimate =

Blog on climatology

- Website type: Blog
- Creators: Gavin Schmidt; Michael E. Mann; Raymond S. Bradley; Eric Steig; Caspar Ammann
- Website: realclimate.org
- Launched: 10 December 2004

RealClimate is a commentary site (blog) on climatology. The site's contributors include climate scientists whose goal is to provide a response to developing stories and a context they feel is sometimes missing in mainstream commentary on climate science and climate change. The forum is moderated, and is restricted to scientific topics to avoid discussion of political or economic implications of the science. RealClimate was launched on 10 December 2004 by nine climate scientists.

== Recognition ==
The creation of RealClimate was the subject of an editorial in the scientific journal Nature, and was reported in the "NetWatch" news feature of the journal Science.

In 2005, the editors of Scientific American recognized RealClimate with a Science and Technology Web Award.

In 2006, Nature compiled a list of the 50 most popular blogs written by scientists, as measured by Technorati. RealClimate was number 3 on that list.

According to Time, RealClimate is "in line with the Web's original purpose: scientific communication" with a "straightforward presentation of the physical evidence for global warming".

== Notable contributors ==
As of July 2017 notable contributors to RealClimate included:

- David Archer
- Rasmus Emil Benestad
- Raymond S. Bradley
- Michael E. Mann
- Raymond Pierrehumbert
- Stefan Rahmstorf
- Gavin Schmidt
- Eric Steig

Past contributors include:

- William Connolley

== See also ==
- Global warming
- Skeptical Science
- CarbonBrief
