= Fred Pearce =

English science writer (born 1951)

- Born: 1951 (age 74–75); United Kingdom
- Occupation: Science writer
- Writing career
- Period: 1982–present
- Genre: Journalism
- Subject: Environment
- Notable works: The New Wild, When the Rivers Run Dry
- Notable awards: 2011 ABSW Lifetime Achievement Award

Fred Pearce (born c. 1951) is an English science writer and public speaker based in London. He reports on the environment, popular science and development issues. He specialises in global environmental issues, including water, population and climate change. He has written many books, including When the Rivers Run Dry and The New Wild, and is a frequent contributor to newspapers such as The Guardian, as well as specialized journals such as Yale Environment 360. In 2011 he was awarded the Association of British Science Writers Lifetime Achievement Award.

== Early life and education ==
Pearce was born in the UK and brought up in Kent. He studied Geography at Cambridge University where he became involved in student journalism, initially as a photographer, then soon began writing. He left Cambridge after two years to pursue journalism.

== Career ==
Pearce is currently the environment consultant of New Scientist magazine and a regular contributor to the British newspapers Daily Telegraph, The Guardian, The Independent, and Times Higher Education. He has also written for several US publications including Yale Environment 360, Foreign Policy, Seed, Time and The New York Times.

Pearce has written books on environmental issues and development issues. He has also written reports and extended journalism for WWF, the UN Environment Programme, the Red Cross, UNESCO, the World Bank, the European Environment Agency, and the UK Environment Agency.

== Global population ==
Pearce has written many articles, opinion pieces and a 2010 book, The Coming Population Crash: And Our Planet's Surprising Future (published as Peoplequake in the UK) about global population. He first became concerned about overpopulation in the 1960's, especially after Paul Ehrlich's book The Population Bomb came out, but later came to believe that consumption is a much bigger environmental threat than population (available without paywall at Retro Report.) Though most reviews of his book were positive, there has also been some major criticism of his writing on population; for instance, Robert Walker, at that time the president of the Population Institute, wrote a rebuttal to his article in Grist.

== Invasive species and rewilding ==
Pearce has written extensively about invasive species and rewilding, including a 2015 book, The New Wild. In the book he criticizes the field of invasion biology, finding many of its claims to be unfounded, and calling into question the distinction between aliens and natives. He argues that nature is always changing, and that invasives are mostly just hardy species in a place where they lack competition, and often lead to a new equilibrium where they play a beneficial role. He does not advocate that we always let invasive species run rampant, writing “It would be foolish to claim that alien species never do any harm or that efforts to uproot them are always doomed to fail.” He also makes the case that invasive species are convenient scapegoats, taking the blame for much of the ecological devastation that humans started in the first place. The book was controversial, with some scientists disagreeing strongly with his arguments. Esther Jackson of the New York Botanical Garden is critical of some of the science and writes "In the hands of less-informed readers, this book runs the risk of being downright dangerous", but concludes that "As a whole, this book is actually worth the read."

In addition to The New Wild, Pearce has written articles on specific related topics such as Ascension Island's ecosystems, whether pristine ecosystems even exist, ecological modernism, and the idea that forests will grow back by themselves if we let them, and that such a passive strategy can be more effective than just planting lots of trees.

== Water resources ==
Some of Pearce's earliest books, including his first in 1982, Watershed: The Water Crisis in Britain, and his 1992 book The Dammed: Rivers, Dams, and the Coming World Water Crisis were about water. He has since written extensively on water resource issues all over the planet, on topics including groundwater, hydropower, drought, dams, conservation and wetlands restoration. Pearce is optimistic about both low-tech and high-tech solutions for reducing water demand.

In 2006, his book When the Rivers Run Dry was published, and a revised and updated version was published in 2018. Jai Singh wrote in SFGate, "Pearce does a masterful job of describing the raft of problems that drying rivers cause." Jeff Holman wrote in The Ecologist, "One of the great strengths of the book is the clarity with which Pearce lays out the effect of diminished water supplies on global politics." In 2020, Steve Paulson interviewed Pearce about the book on To the Best of Our Knowledge.

== Bibliography ==
- Watershed: The Water Crisis in Britain. London: Junction Books. 1982. ISBN 0862450799. OL 16558141M.
- Turning Up the Heat: Our Perilous Future in the Global Greenhouse. London: The Bodley Head. 1989. ISBN 9780370312606. OL 10689904M.
- The Dammed: Rivers, Dams, and the Coming World Water Crisis. London: The Bodley Head. 1992. ISBN 0370316096. OL 10689966M.
- Gribbin, John, ed. (2002). Global Warming. London: DK. ISBN 978-078948419-2. OL 9463939M.
- Deep Jungle. Eden Project Books. 2006. ISBN 9781903919569.
- Earth: Then and Now. Mitchell Beazley. 2007. ISBN 9781845332464.
- The Last Generation. Eden Project Books. 2007. ISBN 9781903919880. Published in the United States as With Speed and Violence: Why scientists fear tipping points in climate change. Beacon Press. 2007. ISBN 9780807085769.
- Confessions of an Eco Sinner. Eden Project Books. 2008. ISBN 9781905811106.
- The Coming Population Crash: and Our Planet's Surprising Future, Beacon Press, 2010. ISBN 978-0-8070-8583-7. Published in the British Isles as Peoplequake. Eden Project Books. 2011. ISBN 9781905811397.
- The Climate Files: The Battle for the Truth About Global Warming, Guardian Books, 2010. ISBN 978-0-85265-229-9
- Written in Water: Messages of Hope for Earth's Most Precious Resource (contributing essayist), National Geographic Society, 2010. ISBN 978-1-4262-0572-9
- The Land Grabbers: The New Fight over Who Owns the Earth, Beacon Press, 2012 ISBN 978-0-8070-0324-4
- The New Wild: Why invasive species will be nature's salvation. Icon Books Ltd. 2016. ISBN 9781785780516.
- When the Rivers Run Dry: Water—The Defining Crisis of the Twenty-First Century (Fully revised and updated version). Beacon Press. 2018. ISBN 9780807054895.
- Fallout: Disasters, Lies, and the Legacy of the Nuclear Age. Beacon Press. 2018. ISBN 9780807092491.
- A Trillion Trees. London: Granta. 2021. ISBN 9781783786916.
- Despite It All: A Handbook for Climate Hopefuls. London: Granta. 2026. ISBN 9781803513638.

== Awards ==
- 2001 RSPB Award for Environment Journalist of the Year (British Environment and Media Awards)
- 2002 CGIAR Science Award for Outstanding Journalism
- 2011 Association of British Science Writers Lifetime Achievement Award
- Pulitzer Center Grantee
