= Audubon (magazine) =

Journal published by the National Audubon Society

- July–August 2012 cover
- Categories: Ornithology; Wildlife conservation
- Frequency: Bi-monthly
- Publisher: National Audubon Society
- Total circulation: 430,279 (2013)
- Founder: Frank Chapman
- Founded: 1899
- Country: USA
- Language: English
- Website: www.audubonmagazine.org
- ISSN: 0004-7694
- OCLC: 6823366

Audubon is the flagship journal of the National Audubon Society. An active blog called The Perch produces daily updates on issues also. In 2011, Audubon received an Utne Reader Independent Press Award for Best Environment Coverage.

== History ==
The earliest serial of the Audubon movement was entitled The Audubon Magazine. It was published between February 1887 through 1889 by George Bird Grinnell, who also published Forest and Stream magazine. Due to lack of funds and other issues, the earliest Audubon movement and its magazine foundered.

Bird-Lore was first published in 1899 by Frank Chapman. The coverpiece described the magazine as the "Official Organ of the Audubon Societies" and "an illustrated bi-monthly magazine devoted to the study and protection of birds". The National Association of Audubon Societies purchased Bird-Lore from Chapman in 1935.

Bird-Lore became the Audubon Magazine in 1941, after the National Association of Audubon Societies became the National Audubon Society in 1940. The name Audubon Magazine was shortened to Audubon in 1966.

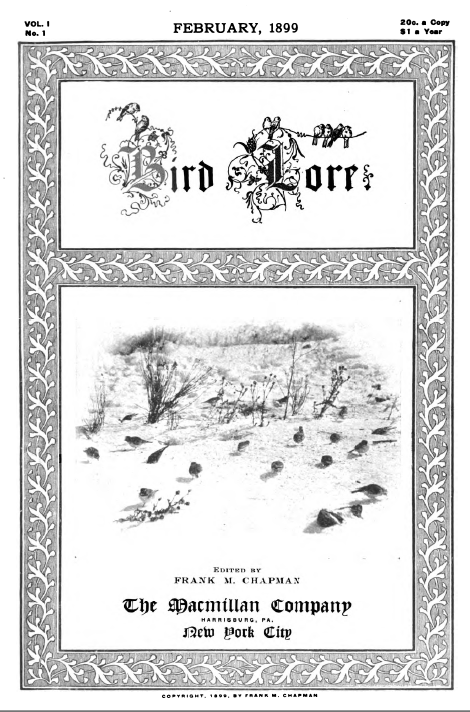
Bird-Lore cover

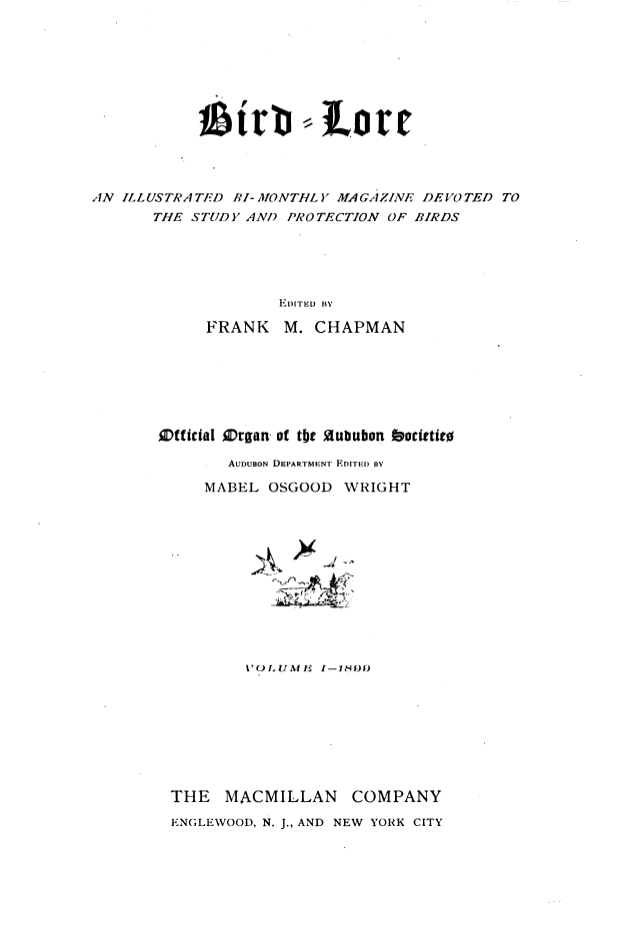
Title page of 1899 edition of Bird-Lore
