= Andrew Montford =

British writer and editor

- Education: BSc (chemistry), CA
- Alma mater: University of St Andrews
- Occupations: Writer and editor
- Known for: Climate-change scepticism
- Notable work: The Hockey Stick Illusion (2010)
- Website: Bishop Hill

Andrew William Montford is a British writer and editor who is the owner of the Bishop Hill blog. He is the author of The Hockey Stick Illusion (2010).

== Early life ==
Montford graduated from the University of St Andrews with a degree in chemistry, then became a chartered accountant. In 2004 he worked with the foundation of Anglosphere, which provides editing services to publishers and other business. His focus at the company is to develop their approach to the publication of scientific literature.

== Public career ==
=== Bishop Hill ===
Montford founded the Bishop Hill blog on 21 November 2006. At first the blog focused on British politics, but its focus changed and in 2010 Montford described it as one of the main websites for global warming sceptics in the United Kingdom.

Matt Ridley writes in The Spectator that Montford became interested in climate change in 2005 after reading a post by blogger Tim Worstall, who was in turn writing about the work of Stephen McIntyre, the editor of the blog Climate Audit. Prior to the publication of Montford's book The Hockey Stick Illusion, his discussions of objections to the Hockey stick graph had been featured in his blog, in particular his summaries of posts from Climate Audit which he called "Caspar and the Jesus Paper".

Bishop Hill has come to public attention several times. In November 2009, The Daily Telegraph blogger James Delingpole credited Bishop Hill with reporting the British Department for Environment, Food and Rural Affairs funding of the Climate Outreach and Information Network charity in the amount of £700,000 over two years. Also in February 2010, Philip Campbell, the editor-in-chief of Nature, resigned from Sir Muir Russell's Independent Climate Change Email Review after Bishop Hill and Channel 4 News drew attention to an interview Campbell had given in 2009 to China Radio International, in which he said there was no evidence the scientists had engaged in a coverup.

=== The Hockey Stick Illusion ===
Montford's The Hockey Stick Illusion: Climategate and the Corruption of Science was published in January 2010 by Stacey International. Montford gave a brief outline of the history of the "hockey stick graph" of global temperatures for the last 1000 years, and argued that more recent research had failed to validate the original studies which appeared in Nature. He commented on the peer review process and Stephen McIntyre's efforts to obtain the data behind the graph. The last few chapters discussed the then-current Climatic Research Unit email controversy ("Climategate"). The book received a number of positive reviews from those who shared his opinions, including those of Matt Ridley in Prospect and Christopher Booker in The Daily Telegraph. Alastair McIntosh, writing in the Scottish Review of Books, strongly criticised the book.

=== Media appearances ===
Montford has been interviewed a number of times about the Climategate controversy. Britain's Channel 4 asked him in March 2010 to look at some of the questions Phil Jones might be asked during the parliamentary inquiry into the controversy. Montford wrote in Times Higher Education that the email conversations at the heart of Climategate "suggest a campaign to nobble journals, marginalise climate-change sceptics and withhold data from other researchers."

He was interviewed in April 2010 by Dennis Prager, an American radio talk show host, and during the same month participated in a live web-debate hosted by The Times; the debate also featured Times environment editor Ben Webster and Bob Ward of the London School of Economics's Grantham Research Institute on Climate Change and the Environment. Montford alleged in the debate that the investigations into the leaking of the e-mails were compromised by "highly questionable memberships." He also questioned the appointment of Lord Oxburgh to the panel, writing that Oxburgh has a "direct financial interest in the outcome of his inquiry."

Also in April 2010, in an interview with Bruce Robbins in The Courier, Montford said, "I believe that CO2, other things being equal, will make the planet warmer. The six million dollar question is how much warmer. I'm less of a sceptic than people think. My gut feeling is still sceptical but I don't believe it's beyond the realms of possibility that the AGW hypothesis might be correct. It's more the case that we don't know and I haven't seen anything credible to persuade me there's a problem."

== Climatic Research Unit emails controversy ==
In July 2010, the Global Warming Policy Foundation (GWPF), a British climate change think tank, hired Montford to lead an inquiry into the three British investigations into the Climatic Research Unit email controversy

Montford's report, The Climategate Inquiries, was published in September 2010. Fred Pearce writes in The Guardian that the three inquiries Montford looked into were all badly flawed, and that Montford's report dissects their systemic failures. He writes that the report, "for all its sharp—and in many cases justified—rejoinders to the official inquiries ... is likely to be ignored in some quarters for its brazen hypocrisy." Pearce argues that one of the criticisms of the three inquiries was that no climate sceptics were on the inquiry teams. Now, the critics themselves have produced a review of the reviews that included no one not already supportive of the sceptical position. But, Pearce added, Montford "has landed some good blows here."

== See also ==
- Global warming controversy
