= Donner Prize =

Canadian publishing award

The Donner Prize
- Awarded for: The best book on Canadian public policy
- Sponsored by: Donner Canadian Foundation
- Date: Annually
- Country: Canada
- First award: 1998

The Donner Prize is an award given annually by one of Canada's largest foundations, the Donner Canadian Foundation, for books considered excellent in regard to the writing of Canadian public policy. The prize was established in 1998, and is meant to encourage an open exchange of ideas and to provide a springboard for authors who can make an original and meaningful contribution to policy discourse. The Donner Canadian Foundation also established the prize to recognize and reward the best public policy thinking, writing and research by a Canadian, and the role it plays in determining the well-being of Canadians and the success of Canada as a whole.

The grand prize is $60,000 and short-listed finalists receive $7,500 each. To be eligible, a book must be on a theme relevant to Canadian policy and be authored by one or more Canadian citizens or permanent residents. Entries are submitted by publishers, and selected by a five-person jury whose members are drawn from the ranks of Canadian professors, university administrators, businesspeople, and politicians. The committee announces a short list in April of each year. The winners and runners-up are announced at an annual awards banquet in April or May.

== Funding organization ==
The Donner Canadian Foundation was established in 1950, and for 43 years was a typical, uncontroversial Canadian charitable fund. From 1993, under the leadership of executive directors Devon Gaffney Cross and then Patrick Luciani, the foundation provided the seed money to start several conservative Canadian think-tanks and publications, and became the "lifeblood of conservative research" in Canada.

The first Donner Prize was awarded in 1998.

== Winners and nominees ==
Year	Author	Title	Ref
1998	Thomas Courchene, Colin Termer	From Heartland to North American Region-State: The Social, Fiscal, and Federal Evolution of Ontario	
1998	Sidney L. Harring	White Man's Law: Native People in Nineteenth Century Canadian Jurisprudence	
1998	Michael Harris	Lament for an Ocean: The Collapse of the Atlantic Cod Fishery	
1998	Mark Holmes	The Reformation of Canada's Schools	
1998	C. Michael MacMillan	The Practice of Language Rights in Canada	
1998	Bob Rae	The Three Questions: Prosperity and the Public Good	
1998	William Watson	Globalization and the Meaning of Canadian Life	
1998	Jeremy Wilson	Talk and Log: Wilderness Politics in British Columbia	
1999	David Gratzer	Code Blue: Reviving Canada's Health Care System	
1999	Stéphane Dion	Straight Talk: Speeches and Writings on Canadian Unity	
1999	Matthew Fraser	Free-for-All: The Struggle for Dominance on the Digital Frontier	
1999	David Paciocco	Getting Away With Murder: The Canadian Criminal Justice System	
1999	Kent Roach	Due Process and Victims' Rights: The New Law and Politics of Criminal Justice	
1999	Jocelyne Saint-Arnaud	Enjeux éthiques et technologies biomedicales	
1999	Donald J. Savoie	Governing from the Centre: The Concentration of Power in Canadian Politics	
2000	Tom Flanagan	First Nation? Second Thoughts	
2000	Alan C. Cairns	Citizens Plus: Aboriginal Peoples and the Canadian State	
2000	David R. Cameron, Graham White	Cycling Into Saigon: The Conservative Transition in Ontario	
2000	Ken Coates	The Marshall Decision and Native Rights	
2000	Daniel Madar	Heavy Traffic: Deregulation, Trade, and Transformation in North American Trucking	
2000	Fred McMahon	Retreat from Growth	
2000	F.L. Morton, Rainer Knopff	The Charter Revolution and the Court Party	
2001	Marie McAndrew	Immigration et diversité a l'école: le débat québécois dans une perspective comparative	
2001	Geoffrey Hale	The Politics of Taxation in Canada	
2001	Jack M. Mintz	Most Favoured Nation: Building a Framework for Smart Economic Policy	
2001	Stan Persky, John Dixon	On Kiddie Porn: Sexual Representation, Free Speech and the Robin Sharpe Case	
2001	Kent Roach	The Supreme Court on Trial: Judicial Activism or Democratic Dialogue	
2001	Donald J. Savoie	Pulling Against Gravity: Economic Development in New Brunswick During the McKenna Years'	
2001	Jeffrey Simpson	The Friendly Dictatorship	
2002	John F. Helliwell	Globalization and Well-Being	
2002	Elizabeth Brubaker	Liquid Assets: Privatizing and Regulating Canada's Water Utilities	
2002	Christopher Essex, Ross McKitrick	Taken by Storm: The Troubled Science, Policy and Politics of Global Warming	
2002	Michael Hart	A Trading Nation: Canadian Trade Policy from Colonialism to Globalization	
2002	Mark Jaccard, John Nyboer, Bryn Sadownik	The Cost of Climate Policy	
2002	Michael Jackson	Justice Behind the Walls: Human Rights in Canadian Prisons	
2002	Daniel Stoffman	Who Gets In: What's Wrong With Canada's Immigration Program and How to Fix It	
2003	Michael Adams	Fire and Ice: The United States, Canada, and the Myth of Converging Values	
2003	Lydia Miljan, Barry Cooper	Hidden Agendas: How Journalists Influence the News	
2003	Eric Montpetit	Misplaced Distrust: Policy Networks and the Environment in France, the United States and Canada	
2003	David E. Smith	The Canadian Senate in Bicameral Perspective	
2004	David Laidler, William Robson	Two Percent Target: Canadian Monetary Policy Since 1991	
2004	Peter S. Grant, Chris Wood	Blockbusters and Trade Wars: Popular Culture in a Globalized World	
2004	Frank P. Harvey	Smoke & Mirrors: Globalized Terrorism and the Illusion of Multilateral Security	
2004	Christopher P. Manfredi	Feminist Activism in the Supreme Court: Legal Mobilization and the Women's Legal Education and Action Fund	
2004	L.W. Summer	The Hateful and the Obscene: Studies in the Limits of Free Expression	
2005	Mark Jaccard	Sustainable Fossil Fuels: The Unusual Suspect in the Quest for Clean and Enduring Energy	
2005	Ronald J. Daniels, Michael Trebilcock	Rethinking the Welfare State: The Prospects for Government by Voucher	
2005	John Ibbitson	The Polite Revolution: Perfecting the Canadian Dream	
2005	David Johnson	Signposts of Success: Interpreting Ontario's Elementary School Test Scores	
2005	James B. Kelly	Governing with the Charter	
2006	Eric Helleiner	Towards North American Monetary Union? The Politics and History of Canada's Exchange Rate Regime	
2006	Roy Rempel	Dreamland: How Canada's Pretend Foreign Policy Has Undermined Sovereignty	
2006	Donald J. Savoie	Visiting Grandchildren: Economic Development in the Maritimes	
2007	David E. Smith	The People's House of Commons: Theories of Democracy in Contention	
2007	Rodrigo Bascunan, Christian Pearce	Enter the Babylon System: Unpacking Gun Culture From Samuel Colt to 50 Cent	
2007	Michael C. Chettleburgh	Young Thugs: Inside the Dangerous World of Canadian Street Gangs	
2007	Robert L. Evans	Fuelling Our Future: An Introduction to Sustainable Energy	
2007	Janice Gross Stein, Eugene Lang	The Unexpected War: Canada in Kandahar	
2008	Ken Coates, P. Whitney Lackenbauer, William R. Morrison, Greg Poelzer	Arctic Front: Defending Canada in the Far North	
2008	Tarek Fatah	Chasing a Mirage: The Tragic Illusion of an Islamic State	
2008	Bruce Little	Fixing the Future: How Canada's Usually Fractious Governments Worked Together to Rescue the Canada Pension Plan	
2008	Andrew Sancton	The Limits of Boundaries: Why City-regions Cannot be Self-governing	
2008	Frances Widdowson	Disrobing the Aboriginal Industry: The Deception Behind Indigenous Cultural Preservation	
2009	Brian Bow	The Politics of Linkage: Power, Interdependence and Ideas in Canada–US Relations	
2009	Michael Byers	Who Owns the Arctic? Understanding Sovereignty Disputes in the North	
2009	Larry Campbell, Neil Boyd, Lori Culbert	A Thousand Dreams: Vancouver's Downtown Eastside and the Fight for Its Future	
2009	Evan H. Potter	Branding Canada: Projecting Canada's Soft Power through Public Diplomacy	
2010	Doug Saunders	Arrival City: The Final Migration and Our Next World	
2010	Pamela Blais	Perverse Cities: Hidden Subsidies, Wonky Policy, and Urban Sprawl	
2010	Tom Flanagan, Christopher Alcantara, André Le Dressay	Beyond the Indian Act: Restoring Aboriginal Property Rights	
2010	Robert Lacroix, Louis Maheu	Le CHUM: une tragédie québécoise	
2010	Harry Swain	Oka: A Political Crisis and Its Legacy	
2011	Peter Aucoin, Mark D. Jarvis, Lori Turnbull	Democratizing the Constitution	
2011	Charles M. Beach, Alan G. Green, Christopher Worswick	Toward Improving Canada's Skilled Immigration Policy: An Evaluation Approach	
2011	Ruth B. Phillips	Museum Pieces: Toward the Indigenization of Canadian Museums	
2011	Neil Seeman, Patrick Luciani	XXL: Obesity and the Limits of Shame	
2012	Jeffrey Simpson	Chronic Condition: Why Canada’s Health Care System Needs to be Dragged into the 21st Century	
2012	Claude Castonguay	Santé: l'heure des choix	
2012	Jennifer Clapp	Hunger in the Balance: The New Politics of International Food Aid	
2012	Mary Janigan	Let the Eastern Bastards Freeze in the Dark: The West Versus the Rest Since Confederation	
2013	Michael Byers	International Law and the Arctic	
2013	Miranda Campbell	Out of the Basement: Youth Cultural Production in Practice and in Policy	
2013	Ron Ellis	Unjust by Design: Canada's Administrative Justice System	
2013	Jim Leech, Jacquie McNish	The Third Rail: Confronting Our Pension Failures	
2013	Gregory Taylor	Shut Off: The Canadian Digital Television Transition	
2014	Michael Trebilcock	Dealing With Losers: The Political Economy of Policy Transitions	
2014	Marcel Boyer, Nathalie Elgrably-Lévy	Reinventer le Québec: Douze chantiers à entreprendre	
2014	Derek H. Burney, Fen Osler Hampson	Brave New Canada: Meeting the Challenge of a Changing World	
2014	Joseph Heath	Enlightenment 2.0: Restoring Sanity to Our Politics, Our Economy, and Our Lives	
2015	Donald J. Savoie	What Is Government Good At? A Canadian Answer	
2015	Marq de Villiers	Back to the Well	
2015	Robert Lacroix, Louis Maheu	Leading Research Universities in a Competitive World	
2015	David Mulroney	Middle Power, Middle Kingdom	
2015	Greg Poelzer, Ken Coates	From Treaty Peoples to Treaty Nation: A Road Map for All Canadians	
2016	Alex Marland	Brand Command: Canadian Politics and Democracy in the Age of Message Control	
2016	Yves Couturier, Lucie Bonin, Louise Belzile	L'intégration des services en santé: Une approche populationnelle	
2016	Juliet Johnson	Priests of Prosperity: How Central Bankers Transformed the Postcommunist World	
2016	Daniel Levitin	A Field Guide to Lies: Critical Thinking in the Information Age	
2016	Sandra Martin	A Good Death: Making the Most of Our Final Choices	
2017	Patricia Meredith, James L. Darroch	Stumbling Giants: Transforming Canada's Banks for the Information Age	
2017	Frédéric Bérard	Charte canadienne et droits linguistiques: Pour en finir avec les myths	
2017	Kelly Gallagher-Mackay, Nancy Steinhauer	Pushing the Limits: How Schools Can Prepare our Children Today for the Challenges of Tomorrow	
2017	Joshua Newman	Governing Public-Private Partnerships	
2017	Kevin Quigley, Ben Bisset, Bryan Mills	Too Critical to Fail: How Canada Manages Threats to Critical Infrastructure	
2018	Thomas J. Courchene	Indigenous Nationals, Canadian Citizens: From First Contact to Canada 150 and Beyond	
2018	Pierre Desrochers, Joanna Szurmak	Population Bombed! Exploding the Link Between Overpopulation and Climate Change	
2018	Evelyn L. Forget	Basic Income for Canadians: The Key to a Healthier, Happier and More Secure Life for All	
2018	Peter MacKinnon	University Commons Divided: Exploring Debate and Dissent on Campus	
2018	Alok Mukherjee, Tim Harper	Excessive Force: Toronto's Fight to Reform City Policing	
2019	Dennis McConaghy	Breakdown: The Pipeline Debate and the Threat to Canada’s Future	
2019	Darrell Bricker, John Ibbitson	Empty Planet	
2019	Wendy Dobson	Living with China	
2019	Tom Flanagan	The Wealth of First Nations	
2019	Richard Stursberg, Stephen Armstrong	The Tangled Garden	
2020	Joseph Heath	The Machinery of Government: Public Administration and the Liberal State	
2020	Maurice Cusson	Sécurité, liberté et criminalité	
2020	Ronald Deibert	Reset: Reclaiming the Internet for Civil Society	
2020	Mark Jaccard	The Citizen’s Guide to Climate Success: Overcoming Myths that Hinder Progress	
2020	Brodie Ramin	The Age of Fentanyl: Ending the Opioid Epidemic	
2021	Dan Breznitz	Innovation in Real Places: Strategies for Prosperity in an Unforgiving World	
2021	Mark Carney	Value(s): Building a Better World for All	
2021	Stephanie Carvin	Stand on Guard	
2021	Carole Anne Hilton	Indigenomics: Taking a Seat at the Economic Table	
2021	André Picard	Neglected No More: The Urgent Need to Improve the Lives of Canada's Elders in the Wake of a Pandemic	
2022	Ryan Manucha	Booze, Cigarettes and Constitutional Dust-Ups: Canada’s Quest for Interprovincial Free Trade	
2022	Joseph Heath	Cooperation and Social Justice	
2022	John Lorinc	Dream States: Smart Cities, Technology, and the Pursuit of Urban Utopias	
2022	Stephen Poloz	The Next Age of Uncertainty: How the World Can Adapt to a Riskier Future	
2022	Kent Roach	Canadian Policing: Why and How It Must Change	
2023	Michael Byers, Aaron Boley	Who Owns Outer Space? International Law, Astrophysics, and the Sustainable Development of Space	
2023	Abdi Aidid, Benjamin Alarie	The Legal Singularity: How Artificial Intelligence Can Make Law Radically Better	
2023	Joanna Baron, Christine Van Geyn	Pandemic Panic: How Canadian Government Responses to COVID-19 Changed Civil Liberties Forever	
2023	Ignacio Cofone	The Privacy Fallacy: Harm and Power in the Information Economy	
2023	Kent Roach	Wrongfully Convicted: Guilty Pleas, Imagined Crimes, and What Canada Must Do to Safeguard Justice	
2024	Kevin Quigley, Kaitlynne Lowe, Sarah Moore, Brianna Wolfe	Seized by Uncertainty: The Markets, Media and Special Interests that Shaped Canada’s Response to COVID-19	
2024	Michael M. Atkinson, Haizhen Mou	Fiscal Choices: Canada After the Pandemic	
2024	Pamela Cross	And Sometimes They Kill You: Confronting the Epidemic of Intimate Partner Violence	
2024	James B. Kelly	Constraining the Court: Judicial Power and Policy Implementation in the Charter Era	
2024	Bryce C. Tingle	Hard Lessons in Corporate Governance	
2025	Darrell Bricker, John Ibbitson	Breaking Point: The New Big Shifts Putting Canada at Risk	
2025	Bob Joseph	21 Things You Need to Know About Indigenous Self-Government: A Conversation About Dismantling the Indian Act	
2025	Tony Keller	Borderline Chaos: How Canada Got Immigration Right, and Then Wrong	
2025	Kevin G. Lynch, James R. Mitchell	A New Blueprint for Government: Reshaping Power, The PMO, and the Public Service	
2025	Tim Wu	The Age of Extraction: How Tech Platforms Conquered the Economy and Threaten Our Future Prosperity	

== See also ==
- Balsillie Prize for Public Policy
