= The Hockey Stick Illusion =

2010 book by Andrew Montford

The Hockey Stick Illusion: Climategate and the Corruption of Science
- Author: A.W. Montford
- Language: English
- Subject: Climate change
- Publisher: Stacey International
- Publication date: 2010
- Publication place: United Kingdom
- Pages: 482
- ISBN: 978-1-906768-35-5

The Hockey Stick Illusion: Climategate and the Corruption of Science is a book written by Andrew Montford and published by Stacey International in 2010, which promotes climate change denial.

Montford, an accountant and science publisher who publishes a blog called 'Bishop Hill', writes about the "hockey stick graph" of global temperatures for the last 1000 years. The book has been criticized for its inaccuracies.

== Background ==
According to Montford, in 2005 he followed a link from a British political blog to the Climate Audit website. While perusing the site, Montford noticed that new readers often asked if there was an introduction to the site and the story of the hockey stick controversy. In 2008, after the story of Caspar Ammann's "purported" replication of the hockey stick became public, Montford wrote his own summary of the controversy.

Montford published the summary on his Bishop Hill blog and called it Caspar and the Jesus paper. Montford states that word of his article caused the traffic to his blog to surge from several hundred hits a day to 30,000 in just three days. Montford adds that there was also an attempt to use his article as a source in Wikipedia. After Montford saw the hockey stick graph used in a science book manuscript he was reviewing, he decided to expand his article into book form.

== Synopsis ==
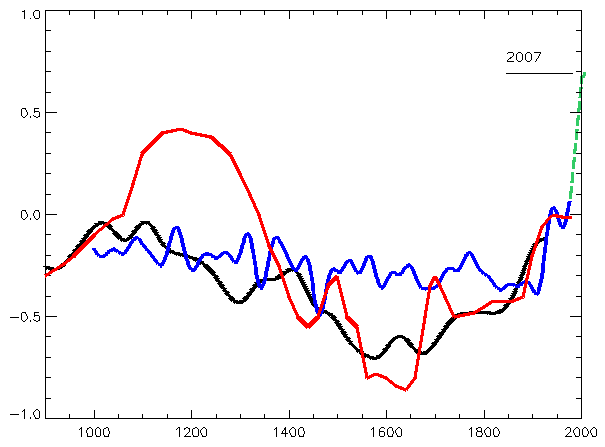
IPCC FAR 1990 Figure 7.1.c (red) based on Lamb 1965 showing central England temperatures; central England temperatures to 2007 shown from Jones et al. 2009 (green dashed line). The high medieval temperatures contrast with the "hockey stick" MBH99 40 year average (blue, uncertainties omitted) and Moberg et al. 2005 low frequency signal (black).

The original Northern Hemisphere hockey stick graph of MBH99, smoothed curve shown in blue with its uncertainty range in light blue, overlaid with green dots showing the 30-year global average of the 2013 reconstruction by the PAGES 2k Consortium 2017. The red curve shows measured global mean temperature, according to HadCRUT4 data from 1850 to 2013.

The Hockey Stick Illusion first outlines a brief history of climate change science with particular emphasis on the description of the Medieval Warm Period in the first IPCC report in 1990, with its inclusion of a schematic based on central England temperatures which Montford describes as a representation of common knowledge at that time. He then argues that a need to overturn this "well-embedded paradigm" was met by the 1998 publication by Michael E. Mann, Raymond S. Bradley and Malcolm K. Hughes' of their "hockey stick graph" in Nature. The book describes how Steve McIntyre first became interested in the graph in 2002 and the difficulties he found in replicating the results of "MBH98" (the original 1998 study) using available datasets, and further data which Mann gave him on request. It details the publication of a paper by McIntyre and Ross McKitrick in 2003 which criticized MBH98, and follows with Mann and his associates' rebuttals. The book recounts reactions to the dispute over the graph, including investigations by the National Academy of Sciences and Edward Wegman and hearings held on the graph before the United States House Energy Subcommittee on Oversight and Investigations. Efforts taken by other scientists to verify Mann's work and McIntyre's and others' responses to those efforts are described.

The last chapter of the book deals with what the book calls "Climategate". Here, the author compares several e-mails to the evidence he presents in The Hockey Stick Illusion. Montford focuses on those e-mails dealing with the peer review process and how these pertained to Stephen McIntyre's efforts to obtain the data and methodology from Mann's and other paleoclimatologists' published works.

== Reception ==
Montford had set out to provide a more detailed explanation than the primers Ross McKitrick had written describing the case he and McIntyre had produced against the MBH climate reconstructions, and when McKitrick contributed to a 2014 compilation published by the Institute of Public Affairs think-tank, he opened with a sentence saying the "best place to start when learning about the hockey stick is Andrew Montford's superb book". Matt Ridley discussed it in The Spectator, and in Prospect magazine said the book was "written with grace and flair" and deserved to win prizes, while conceding that he had financial interests in coal mining.

Other reviewers criticized the book as providing cover for individuals opposing action on climate change. Bob Ward in The Guardian described how "Montford's entertaining conspiracy yarn" presented arguments based on "glaring inaccuracies". In Geoscientist, Ward said Montford's "incredible yarn is based on a misleading and one-sided version of events, littered with inaccuracies". Nick Hewitt in Chemistry World outlined the basic physics of climate change, and said that, unable to dispute this, climate deniers, "(or sceptics as they are disingenuously described in this book) have made sustained attempts to discredit climate scientists and the way they work", concluding that "Readers of Chemistry World will have far better things to do than read this pedantic book." Richard Joyner, writing in Prospect, described it as "a McCarthyite book that uses the full range of smear tactics to peddle climate change denial."

== See also ==
- Climatic Research Unit email controversy
- Historical climatology
- Medieval Warm Period
- Global warming controversy

== Bibliography and further reading ==
- Booker, Christopher (2009). The Real Global Warming Disaster. Continuum International Publishing Group Ltd. ISBN 978-1-4411-1052-7.
- Montford, Andrew (2008-08-11). "Caspar and the Jesus paper".
- Montford, Andrew (2010). The Hockey Stick Illusion. Stacey International. p. 482. ISBN 978-1-906768-35-5.
- PAGES 2k Consortium (11 July 2017). "A global multiproxy database for temperature reconstructions of the Common Era - Scientific Data". Scientific Data. 4 (1): 170088. doi:10.1038/sdata.2017.88. PMC 5505119. PMID 28696409.
