= Donald J. Savoie =

Canadian public administration and regional economic development scholar

Donald J. Savoie CC ONB FRSC
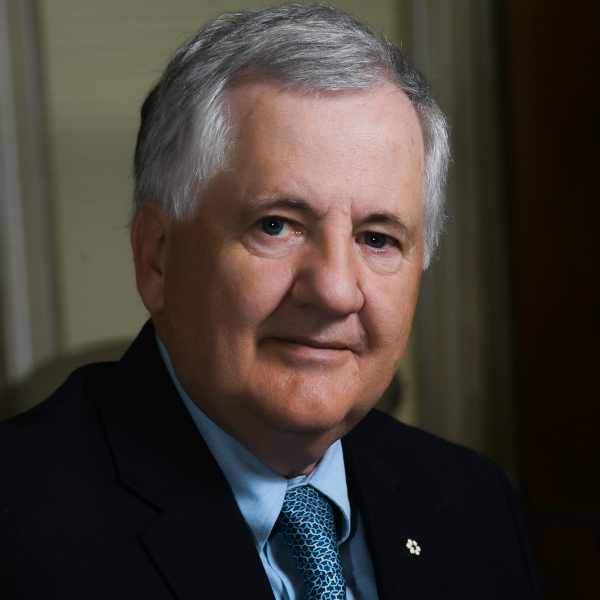
- Born: Donald Joseph Savoie; 1947 (age 78–79); Saint-Maurice, New Brunswick, Canada
- Awards: Killam Prize (2015)

Academic background
- Education: Université de Moncton; University of New Brunswick; University of Oxford
- Thesis: Collaboration in Federal–Provincial Relations in Canada (1979)

Academic work
- Discipline: Public administration
- Institutions: Université de Moncton

Donald Joseph Savoie OC ONB FRSC (born 1947) is a Canadian public administration and regional economic development scholar. He served as a professor at l'Université de Moncton, and as a Canada research chair in public administration and governance.

== Publications ==
Savoie has published many books, journal articles, and essays in edited collections. His publications include Federal–Provincial Collaboration (Montreal: McGill-Queen's University Press, 1981); Breaking the Bargain: Public Servants, Ministers, and Parliament (Toronto: University of Toronto Press, 2003); Thatcher, Reagan, Mulroney: In Search of a New Bureaucracy (Pittsburgh: University of Pittsburgh Press, 1994); and What Is Government Good At?: A Canadian Answer (Montreal: McGill-Queen's University Press, 2015).

Other publications include:

- An overview of the importance of federal–provincial relations on regional development: the restructuring of 1982, Moncton: Canadian Institute for Research on Regional Development, 1984. (ISBN 0-88659-003-5)
- Regional Economic Development: Canada's Search for Solutions, Toronto: University of Toronto Press, 1986, reprinted 1987, 2nd ed. in 1992.
- The Politics of Public Spending in Canada, Toronto: University of Toronto Press, 1990, reprinted 1990 and 1991.
- The Politics of Language, Kingston: Institute of Intergovernmental Relations, Queen's University, 1991, 23 pp. (ISBN 0-88911-586-9)
- Globalization and Governance, Ottawa: Canadian Centre for Management Development, 1993, 37 pp. (ISBN 0-662-98781-0)
- Rethinking Canada's regional development policy: a view of the Atlantic, Moncton: Canadian Institute for Research on Regional Development, 1997, 67 pp.
- Governing from the Centre: The Concentration of Power in Canadian Politics, Toronto: University of Toronto Press, 1999, reprinted 1999, 2000, 2001, 2004 and 2006.
- Community Economic Development in Atlantic Canada: False Hope or Panacea, Moncton: Canadian Institute for Research on Regional Development, 2000, 131 pp.
- Aboriginal Economic Development in New Brunswick, Moncton: Canadian Institute for Research on Regional Development, 2000, 143 pp.
- Pulling Against Gravity: Economic Development in New Brunswick During the McKenna Years, Montreal: McGill-Queen's University Press, 2001.
- Visiting Grandchildren: Economic Development in the Maritimes, Toronto: University of Toronto Press, 2006, reprinted 2006.
- Court Government and the Collapse of Accountability in Canada and the United Kingdom, Toronto: University of Toronto Press, 2008, reprinted 2008.
- I'm From Bouctouche, Me, Montreal: McGill-Queen's University Press, 2009, 316 pp. (A memoir.)
- Power: Where Is It?, Montreal: McGill-Queen's University Press, 2010.
- Whatever Happened to the Music Teacher? How Government Decides How and Why, Montreal, McGill-Queen's University Press, 2013, reprinted 2014, 336 pp.
- Harrison McCain: Single-Minded Purpose, Montreal: McGill-Queen's University Press, 2013, 336 pp.
- Looking for Bootstraps: Economic Development in the Maritimes, Halifax: Nimbus Publishing, 2017, 440 pp.
- Democracy in Canada: The Disintegration of Our Institutions Montreal: McGill-Queen's University Press, 2019, 504 pp.
- Thanks for the Business: K.C. Irving, Arthur Irving and the Story of Irving Oil, Halifax: Nimbus, 2020.

=== With B. Guy Peters (eds.) ===
- New Challenges of Governance, Ottawa: Canadian Centre for Management / Presses de l'Université Laval, 1995, 306 pp. (ISBN 2 -7637-7445-8)
- Managing Incoherence: The dilemma of coordination and accountability, Ottawa: Canadian Centre for Management Development, 1995. (ISBN 0-662-61696-0)
- Taking Stock: Assessing Public Sector Reforms, Québec: Presses de l'Université Laval, 1998, 311 pp. (ISBN 2-7637-7574-8)
- Governance in the Twenty-first Century: Revitalizing the Public Service, Québec: Presses de l'Université Laval, 2001, 328 pp. (ISBN 2-7637-7765-1)

=== With Ralph Winter (eds.) ===
- Les provinces maritimes : un regard sur l'avenir / The Maritime Provinces: looking to the future, Moncton: Canadian Institute for Research on Regional Development, 1994, 288 pp. (ISBN 0-88659-027-2)

=== With Maurice Beaudin ===
- La lutte pour le développement: le cas du Nord Est, Québec, Les presses de l’Université du Québec, 1988. In English as The Struggle for Development: the case of the North East, Moncton: Presses de l'Université du Québec / Canadian Institute for Research on Regional Development, 1988, 282 pp.
- New Brunswick in 2000, Moncton: Canadian Institute for Research on Regional Development, 1989, 200 pp. (ISBN 0-88659-018-3)
- The challenges of the fishing industry in New Brunswick, Moncton: Acadia Publishing, 1992, 282 pp. (ISBN 2-7600-0208-X)

=== With André Raynauld ===
- Essais sur le développement régional, Montreal: Presses de l'Université de Montréal, 1986, 242 pp. (ISBN 2-7606-0735-6)

=== With Niles Hansen and Benjamin Higgins ===
- Regional Policy in a Changing World, New York: Plenum Press, 1990.

== Prizes and awards ==
Savoie has won numerous prizes and awards, including the Royal Society of Canada’s 2018 Yvan Allaire Medal for outstanding contribution in governance (inaugural recipient), the 2015 Donner Prize and the 2016 Writers’ Federation of New Brunswick Book Award for Non-fiction (inaugural recipient) for What Is Government Good At?, the 2015 Killam Prize in Social Sciences, the Order of New Brunswick (2011), finalist for the SSHRC Gold Medal for Achievement in Research (2003), the Vanier Gold Medal (1999), honoured by the Public Policy Forum at its twelfth annual testimonial awards (1999), made an Officer of the Order of Canada (1993), elected Fellow of the Royal Society of Canada (1992), selected the Université de Moncton's alumnus of the year (1991). Three of his books were short listed for the Donner Prize, The Politics of Public Spending in Canada was the inaugural recipient of the Smiley prize (1992) awarded by the Canadian Political Science Association for the best book in the study of government and politics in Canada and Les défis de l’industrie des pêches au Nouveau-Brunswick was awarded “Le Prix France-Acadie” (1993).

He has been awarded honorary doctorates by the Université Sainte-Anne (1993), Mount Allison University (1997), Dalhousie University (2003), Saint Mary's University (Halifax) (2011), Acadia University (2014) and the University of Ottawa (2018).

Awards
Preceded by Michael Trebilcock	Donner Prize; 2015	Succeeded by Alex Marland
Preceded by D. R. Fraser Taylor	Killam Prize in Social Sciences; 2015	Succeeded by Daniel Trefler
