= Peter Aucoin =

Canadian academic (1943–2011)

- Born: October 3, 1943; Halifax, Nova Scotia, Canada
- Died: July 7, 2011 (aged 67)
- Education: Saint Mary's University (B.A., honorary doctorate); Dalhousie University (M.A.); Queen's University (Ph.D.)
- Scientific career
- Fields: Political science, public administration
- Workplaces: Dalhousie University

Peter Charles Aucoin CM FRSC (October 3, 1943 – July 7, 2011) was a professor emeritus of political science and public administration at Dalhousie University in Halifax, Canada. He is recognized as one of the leading theorists on the practice and reform of public administration and governance. He was a fellow of the Royal Society of Canada and a member of the Order of Canada. He also served as an advisor to the Government of Canada as well as provincial and municipal governments.

== Early life ==
Aucoin was born in 1943 in Halifax. He attended Saint Mary's University High School, and went on to get his Bachelor of Arts from Saint Mary's University. He earned his master's degree from Dalhousie University, and his Ph.D. from Queen's University.

== Career ==
Aucoin was appointed to the Dalhousie University faculty in 1970, and became a full professor nine years later. From 1985 to 1990, he was the director of the School of Public Administration, and from 1992 to 1995, he served as chairman of the Department of Political Science. When he retired in 2009, he was the Eric Dennis Memorial Professor of Government and Political Science and Professor of Public Administration.

Aucoin worked in an advisory capacity to the Canadian government at federal, provincial, and municipal levels. He was the Science Advisor for the Science Council of Canada, and coordinated research with the Royal Commission on the Economic Union and Development Prospects for Canada from 1985 to 1986. He was the director of research for the Royal Commission on Electoral Reform and Party Financing from 1990 to 1991, as well as the Halifax Commission on City Government. He was also senior fellow of the Canada School of Public Service. Aucoin also was called upon several times to be the lead expert witness in court cases relating to election and referendum law, including spending limits on third party election advertising in Canada. He was a member of the board of directors of the Institute for Research on Public Policy.

From 1995 to 1996, Aucoin was the president of the Canadian Political Science Association. He also was previously the vice president of the Institute of Public Administration of Canada. He also served on many editorial boards of both Canadian and international academic journals. He co-edited the book series published by the Institute of Public Administration of Canada. Aucoin himself was a prolific writer, authoring and editing fifteen books and eighty articles and book chapters. His article "Administrative Reform in Public Management: Paradigms, Principles, Paradoxes and Pendulums" in the journal Governance is a highly cited and seminal article describing New Public Management reforms. His 2011 book Democratizing the Constitution: Reforming Responsible Government, co-authored with Mark D. Jarvis and Lori Turnbull, received the 2011 Donner Prize rewarding excellence and innovation in public policy writing by Canadians as well as the Donald Smiley Prize from the Canadian Political Science Association.

Aucoin died on July 7, 2011. On March 21, 2011, the journal Governance published what would be Aucoin's last published article in which he identified and described a new approach to governing he labelled New Political Governance.

== Awards and recognition ==
- 1994: J. E. Hodgetts for an article published in Canadian Public Administration
- 1995: Charles Levine Book Prize for The New Public Management: Canada in Comparative Perspective
- 1999: Lieutenant Governor of Nova Scotia 1999 Medal for Excellence in Public Administration
- 2004: J. E. Hodgetts for an article published in Canadian Public Administration
- 2005: Governor General Vanier Medal for Exceptional Achievement in Public Administration
- 2006: elected Fellow of the Royal Society of Canada
- 2006: Dalhousie University Alumni Association Award for Teaching Excellence
- 2007: appointed a Member of the Order of Canada
- 2011: received an Honorary Doctorate of Civil Law from Saint Mary's University
- 2011: posthumously received the Donner Prize (with Mark D. Jarvis and Lori Turnbull) for Democratizing the Constitution
- 2012: posthumously received the Donald Smiley Prize (with Mark D. Jarvis and Lori Turnbull) for Democratizing the Constitution from the Canadian Political Science Association

Aucoin's work continues to inspire and influence the work of colleagues, most notably G. Bruce Doern and Michael J. Prince, in Canadian public administration and policy studies.

== Publications ==
- Aucoin, Peter; Jarvis, Mark D.; Turnbull, Lori (2011). Democratizing the Constitution: Reforming Responsible Government. Emond Montgomery Publications. ISBN 978-1-55239-463-2.
