= John Elvidge =

British civil servant (born 1951)

Sir John Elvidge KCB
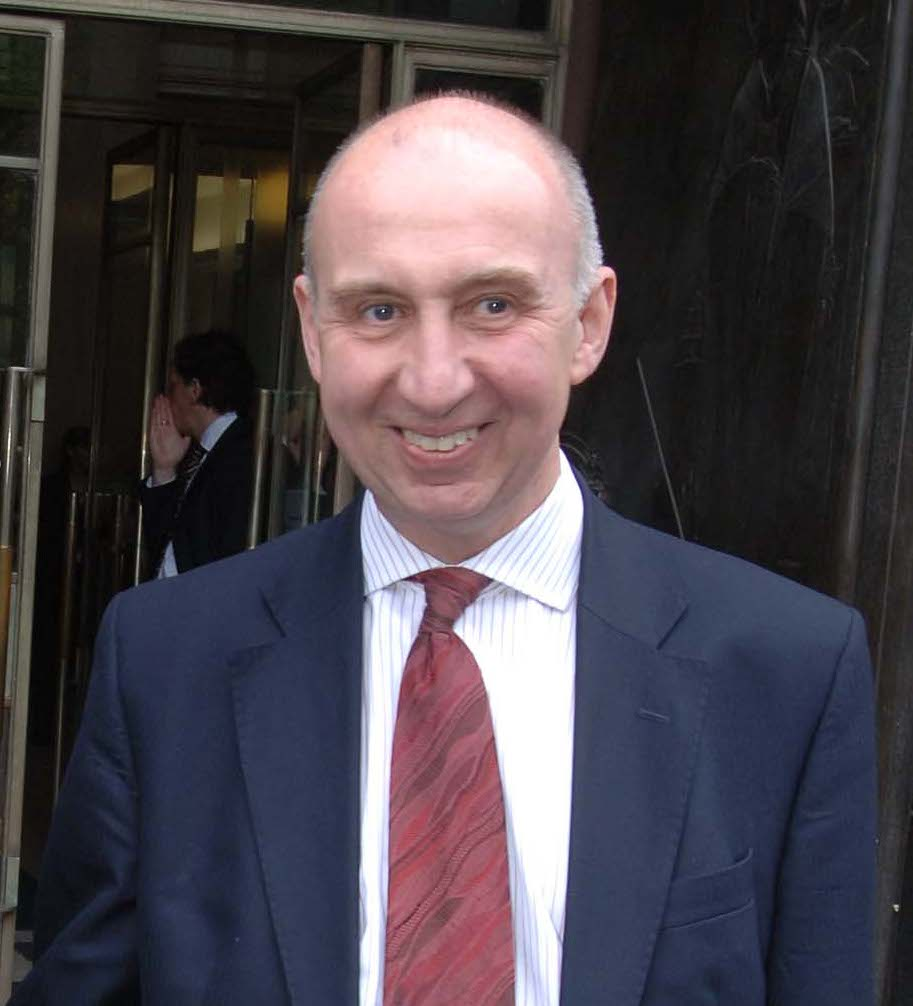

Permanent Secretary to the Scottish Government
- In office July 2003 – June 2010
- First Minister: Jack McConnell; Alex Salmond
- Preceded by: Muir Russell
- Succeeded by: Peter Housden

Personal details
- Born: 9 February 1951 (age 75) London, England
- Spouse: Maureen Margaret Ann McGinn
- Education: St Catherine's College, Oxford
- Occupation: Civil Servant

Sir John William Elvidge KCB, FRSE (born 9 February 1951) is the former Permanent Secretary to the Scottish Government. He was appointed in July 2003, replacing Sir Muir Russell. He retired from the post in June 2010.

== Early life ==
He was born on 9 February 1951, son of Herbert William Elvidge and Irene Teresa Reynolds, and educated at Sir George Monoux School in Walthamstow, North- East London. He studied English language and literature at St Catherine's College, Oxford, graduating with a Bachelor of Arts degree. In 1973, he joined the Civil Service, working in the Scottish Office.

== Civil service ==
While at the Scottish Office, Elvidge worked particularly in the fields of economic development, physical infrastructure and European Union relations. He was seconded to Scottish Homes, from 1988 to 1989, and to the Cabinet Office, from 1998 to 1999, where he was involved in co-ordination of the Government's legislative programme and social policies. In May 1999, he was appointed Head of the Scottish Government Education Department, and in March 2002 became Head of the Finance and Central Services Department. In 2003, he became Permanent Secretary to the Scottish Government, succeeding Sir Muir Russell, who became Principal of the University of Glasgow. He announced his retirement on 21 May 2010, to take effect in June, to enable his successor to prepare for the Scottish Parliament elections in May 2011.

== Appointment as chairman of Edinburgh Airport ==
In May 2012 it was announced that Elvidge had been appointed by Global Infrastructure Partners as chairman of Edinburgh Airport. The appointment was effective from 1 June 2012, following completion of Global Infrastructure Partners' £807.2 million acquisition of the airport from BAA.

== Honours and awards ==
Elvidge was created a Knight Commander of the Bath (KCB) in the 2006 Birthday Honours. He was elected a Fellow of the Royal Society of Edinburgh in 2009.

== Personal life ==
He is married to Maureen McGinn (Lady Elvidge) who is a member of the Scotland Committee of the Big Lottery, chair of the Board of ASH Scotland, and was chief executive of the Laidlaw Youth Trust which funded effective interventions supporting children and vulnerable young people in Scotland. She was awarded a CBE in the 2021 New Year Honours.

His interests include painting, film, theatre, music, modern novels, sport, the arts and food and wine.

Government offices
Preceded by Sir Muir Russell	Permanent Secretary to the Scottish Government; 2003–2010	Succeeded by Sir Peter Housden
