= Jeffrey Simpson =

Canadian journalist

- Born: Jeffrey Carl Simpson; February 17, 1949 (age 77); New York City, U.S.
- Education: Queen's University; London School of Economics
- Occupation: Journalist

Jeffrey Carl Simpson, OC (born February 17, 1949), is a Canadian journalist. Simpson was The Globe and Mail's national affairs columnist for almost three decades. He has won all three of Canada's leading literary prizes: the Governor General's Award for non-fiction book writing, the National Magazine Award for political writing, and the National Newspaper Award for column writing. He has also won the Hyman Solomon Award for excellence in public policy journalism and the Donner Prize for the best public policy book by a Canadian. In January 2000, he became an Officer of the Order of Canada.

Simpson retired from the Globe and Mail at the end of June 2016.

== Early life ==
Simpson was born in New York City and moved to Canada when he was 10 years old. Educated at the University of Toronto Schools, he graduated from Queen's University in 1971 in History and Political Science. There, he worked for the campus radio station CFRC and won the university's Tricolour Award in his graduating year. He then went on to the London School of Economics.

In 1972 to 1973, he worked as a Parliamentary Intern in Ottawa, where he worked for Ed Broadbent. Then, he joined The Globe and Mail.

== Career ==
Simpson's career with the Globe and Mail began at City Hall in Toronto and with coverage of Quebec politics. In 1977, he became a member of the paper's Ottawa, bureau and 18 months later, he was named as its Ottawa bureau chief. From 1981–1983, Simpson served as the paper's European correspondent, based in London. From January 1984 to June 2016, he wrote a daily Globe and Mail column on national affairs.

Simpson has written numerous magazine articles for such publications as Saturday Night, Report on Business Magazine, the Journal of Canadian Studies, Queen's Quarterly, and the Literary Review of Canada. He has spoken at dozens of major conferences in Canada and internationally on a variety of domestic and international issues.

Simpson is a frequent and enthusiastic participant in regular political debate on radio or television, in French and in English. He has been a guest lecturer at such universities as Oxford, Edinburgh, Harvard, Princeton, Brigham Young, Johns Hopkins, Maine, California, and more than a dozen universities in Canada.

In 1993–1994, Simpson was on leave from his column as a John S. Knight fellow at Stanford University in Palo Alto, California. He has been a Skelton-Clark fellow and Brockington Visitor at Queen's University. He has also been a John V. Clyne fellow at the University of British Columbia, a distinguished visitor at the University of Alberta, and a member of the Georgetown University Leadership Seminar. He has been awarded honorary doctorates of laws from the University of British Columbia and the University of Western Ontario.

Simpson has been a member of the board of trustees at Queen's University; the board of overseers at Green College, University of British Columbia; the advisory board of the Review of Constitutional Studies at the University of Alberta; the editorial board of The Queen's Quarterly, and the Canadian Consortium for Asia-Pacific Security at York University and the University of Toronto. He has been vice-chairman of the City of Ottawa Library Board.

Simpson is a Senior Fellow at the University of Ottawa’s Graduate School of Public and International Affairs.

In 2006, Simpson was awarded the Charles Lynch Award in recognition of his outstanding coverage of national issues.

Simpson is also an outspoken critic of the monarchy of Canada and has written in favour of republicanism in his column.

Simpson is an avid Ottawa Senators fan and in 2011 attempted to convince the team to replace its general manager, Bryan Murray by referencing his position as the national affairs columnist on the letterhead of the Globe and Mail to demand the change. He threatened to not renew his season tickets unless the team fired its general manager.

Simpson is also a member of the Trilateral Commission.

== Bibliography ==
Simpson has authored eight books:

- 1980 - Discipline of Power: The Conservative interlude and the Liberal Restoration, winner of the 1980 Governor General's Award for Non-Fiction.
- 1988 - Spoils of Power: The Politics of Patronage
- 1993 - Faultlines: Struggling for a Canadian Vision
- 1996 - The Anxious Years: Politics In The Age Of Mulroney And Chretien
- 2000 - Star-Spangled Canadians: Canadians living the American Dream
- 2001 - The Friendly Dictatorship
- 2007 - Hot Air: Meeting Canada's Climate Change Challenge (co-authored with Mark Jaccard and Nicholas J. "Nic" Rivers)
- 2012 - Chronic Condition: Why Canada's Health Care System Needs to be Dragged into the 21st Century

== See also ==
- List of newspaper columnists
