= Ken Coates =

Ken Coates may refer to:

- Ken Coates (politician)
- Ken Coates (historian)
