= Finance Directorates =

The Scottish Government Finance Directorates are a group of civil service Directorates in the Scottish Government created by a December 2010 re-organisation.

The individual directorates within the overarching finance directorates report to the director-general, Alyson Stafford CBE.

== Ministers ==
There is no direct relationship between ministers and the directorates. However, in general, the activities of the directorates include those under the purview of the Cabinet secretary for finance and the Constitution.

== Directorates ==
The overarching Scottish Government Directorates were preceded by similar structures called "Departments" that no longer exist (although the word is still sometimes used in this context).

As an overarching unit, the Finance Directorates incorporate the:

- Scottish Procurement and Commercial Directorate - Director: Alistair Merrill
- Legal Services Directorate - Director & Solicitor to the Scottish Government: Murray Sinclair
- Planning & Environmental Appeals Directorate - Director & Chief Reporter: Lindsey Nicoll
- Parliamentary Counsel Office - Director: Andy Beattie

== History ==
Prior to the creation of the Finance Directorates in 2010, many of their responsibilities were undertaken by the Scottish Government Finance and Corporate Services Directorates and prior to 2007 by the Scottish Executive Finance and Central Services Department.

== See also ==
- Scottish budget
