= Climate Audit =

Climate change skeptic blog by Steve McIntyre

- Website type: Blog
- Available in: English
- Owner: Steve McIntyre
- Creator: Steve McIntyre
- Revenue: Donations
- Website: ClimateAudit.org
- Launched: 31 January 2005
- Current status: Live

Climate Audit is a blog founded in 2005 by Steve McIntyre.

In November 2009 journalist Andrew Revkin described it in The New York Times as "a popular skeptics’ blog" run by McIntyre, a retired Canadian mining consultant. In 2010, a Nature article described the site as part of the "climate change skeptic community" alongside the Air Vent and the Blackboard.

== Founding ==
In 2004 Stephen McIntyre blogged on his website climate2003.com about his efforts with Ross McKitrick to get an extended analysis of the hockey stick graph into the journal Nature.

On 25 October 2004 McIntyre posted comments on climate2003.com about a piece by William Connolley circulated on various blogs, and on 26 October wrote, "Maybe I’ll start blogging some odds and ends that I’m working on. I’m going to post up some more observations on some of the blog criticisms." On 1 December Michael E. Mann and nine other scientists launched the RealClimate website as "a resource where the public can go to see what actual scientists working in the field have to say about the latest issues." On climate2003.com McIntyre noted this development in a blog post on 10 December, where he wrote "Mann and some of his colleagues have set up a blog at the above address. A couple of Mann's first postings have been arguments against our papers. I'll post up a two quick comments below." On 2 February 2005 McIntyre set up his Climate Audit blog, having found difficulties with posting comments on the climate2003.com layout.

Judith Curry of the Georgia Institute of Technology has said "McIntyre started the blog climateaudit.org so that he could defend himself against claims being made at the blog Realclimate with regards to his critique of the “hockey stick” since he was unable to post his comments there". She has also referred to this site as one of several "Climate Auditor" websites.

== Climatic Research Unit information requests and email controversy ==
After the UK Freedom of Information Act (FOIA) came into effect in 2005, Climate Audit readers were asked to make FOI requests to the Climatic Research Unit (CRU) at the University of East Anglia (UEA) for the raw data from weather stations used in developing instrumental temperature record datasets, for copies of agreements under which the raw data was obtained from meteorology institutions, and also for email correspondence relating to the Intergovernmental Panel on Climate Change Fourth Assessment Report. On 12 August 2009, Olive Heffernan wrote in naturenews that "Since 2002, Steve McIntyre, the editor of Climate Audit, a blog that investigates the statistical methods used in climate science, has repeatedly asked Phil Jones, director of the Climatic Research Unit (CRU) at the University of East Anglia, UK, for access to monthly global surface temperature data held by the institute. But in recent weeks, Jones has been swamped by a sudden surge in demands for data". She described how CRU had received 58 FOIA requests between 24 and 29 July 2009 from McIntyre or others associated with the blog. The raw data was restricted to academics, and the unit's director Phil Jones said that the data was subject to confidentiality agreements with various governments, but he was seeking agreement to get the raw data available online. He said that “Data release needs to be done in a systematic way.”

The site was one of the first to receive word of the e-mails which had been leaked from the University of East Anglia with Jonathan Leake of The Times writing, "The storm began with just four cryptic words. 'A miracle has happened,' announced a contributor to Climate Audit, a website devoted to criticising the science of climate change." Louise Gray wrote in The Daily Telegraph, "Climate Audit was one of the first to post up the stolen emails from the University of East Anglia that led to the 'climategate' scandal".

Bloomberg said of the controversy, "Web sites and blogs including the Climate Audit Mirror Site have carried copies of e-mails, correspondence between climatologists and commentary. In one e-mail cited widely on blogs including Climate Audit, Phil Jones writes about completing “Mike’s nature trick of adding in the real temps” in order to hide the decline." According to Antonio Regalado writing in Science Insider, Jones wrote e-mails stating that he convinced the university's FOI managers to not release data to "greenhouse skeptics" because Jones believed that they planned to harm the UEA or setback climate science by drawing scientists into disputes, wasting research time. "Think I've managed to persuade UEA to ignore all further FOIA requests if the people have anything to do with Climate Audit," Jones wrote in 2007. The House of Commons' Science and Technology Committee largely vindicated the scientists involved in the scandal, but left consideration of the quality of the science and the conduct of the research to committees chaired by Lord Oxburgh and Sir Muir Russell. Fox News said that McIntyre "who also worked at the IPCC and submitted notes to the Science and Technology Committee for its investigation, wrote a lengthy rebuttal of the decision on his blog", and disputed the committee's conclusion that the word trick "appears to be a colloquialism for a 'neat' method of handling data". Further investigations by the United States Environmental Protection Agency, the Inspector General of the United States Department of Commerce and the Office of the Inspector General (OIG) of the National Science Foundation reaffirmed that the accusations against the scientists were unfounded.

== Reception ==
James Hansen, the former director of NASA's Goddard Institute, has dismissed McIntyre as a "court jester".

"If a single person can be credited with setting the stage for Climategate, it's Stephen McIntyre, the retired mining consultant behind the popular skeptic blog Climate Audit," wrote Kate Sheppard at Mother Jones in 2011. "Emails from this period show the scientists lashing out against McIntyre. He is referred to as a "bozo" and "a playground bully." McIntyre clearly gets a rise out of irking scientists, whom he frequently refers to as 'the Team'—another play on the hockey-stick metaphor. He likes to 'tease these guys and kind of make fun of them,' he says, and their evident aggravation at his inquiries only egged him on. 'I think it was a mistake for them to in effect adopt a fatwa against Climate Audit,' says McIntyre."

Patrick J. Michaels, a former contributor to the IPCC and a former fellow at the denialist Cato Institute, named Climate Audit as part of 'a new “parallel universe” of emerging online publications, manned by serious scientists critical of world governments approach to climate change'. “A parallel universe is assembling itself parallel to the IPCC. This universe has become very technical -- very proficient at taking apart the U.N.’s findings."

Internet voting by the public organized by the Weblog Awards, a right-wing blog sponsored by conservative media group Wizbang LLC, won the website the 2007 Weblog "Best Science Blog" award and it was a runner up in the same category in 2008.

== See also ==
- Global warming controversy
- The Hockey Stick Illusion
- Tree ring
