= Breznitz =

Breznitz (Hebrew: ברזניץ) is a surname. Notable people with the surname include:

- Dan Breznitz, Canadian political scientist
- Shlomo Breznitz (1936–2026), Israeli author, psychologist, politician, and founder
