= Tom Courchene =

Canadian economist (1940–2025)

Thomas Joseph Courchene
- Born: 16 September 1940; Wakaw, Saskatchewan, Canada
- Died: 4 November 2025 (aged 85)
- Education: University of Saskatchewan; Princeton University
- Occupation: Economist

Thomas Joseph Courchene OC FRSC (16 September 1940 – 4 November 2025) was a Canadian economist and academic.

== Life and career ==
Born in Wakaw, Saskatchewan on 16 September 1940, he received an Honours Bachelor of Arts from the University of Saskatchewan in 1962. He received his PhD from Princeton University in 1967. In 1969, he received a post-doctoral fellowship from the University of Chicago. He started teaching as a lecturer in economics at the University of Western Ontario in 1965. In 1970, he became a professor of Economics and he taught there until 1988. From 1988 to 1992, he was the Director of the School of Policy Studies at Queen's University. He was a professor of economic and financial policy at Queen's University and was a senior scholar at the Institute for Research on Public Policy in Montreal.

From 1988 to 1991, he was a member of the Economic Council of Canada. From 1980 to 1999, he was a Senior Fellow of the C.D. Howe Institute.

In 1998, he was made an Officer of the Order of Canada. In 1981, he was made a Fellow of Royal Society of Canada.

Courchene wrote a number of books and more than 250 articles on Canadian monetary, health, and social policy. His 1994 book, Social Canada in the Millennium, and his 2018 book, ''Indigenous Nationals, Canadian Citizens: From First Contact to Canada 150 and Beyond won the Donner Prize for excellence in writing of Canadian public policy. He also won the Doug Purvis Memorial Prize in 1995, for his written contribution to Canadian economic policy.

He ran unsuccessfully as a Progressive Conservative candidate in the riding of London East in London, Ontario in the 1979 federal election.

Courchene died on 4 November 2025, at the age of 85.

== See also ==
- Hourglass Federalism
