= Evelyn L. Forget =

Canadian health economist

Evelyn Louise Forget (born 1956) is a Canadian health economist with expertise in the feasibility of basic income. She is a professor in Community Health Sciences at the Max Rady College of Medicine at the University of Manitoba, and the academic director at the Manitoba Research Data Centre. In 2021, Forget was appointed as a Fellow in the Royal Society of Canada, and an Officer of the Order of Canada for "advancing anti-poverty initiatives in Canada and around the world."

== Education ==
Forget received her master's degree and PhD from the University of Toronto.

== Publications ==
She is the author of the 2018 book "Basic Income for Canadians: The Key to a Healthier, Happier and More Secure Life for All", which was shortlisted for the 2018/19 Donner Prize. In 2020, Forget updated the book to focus on the impact of the pandemic, titled "Basic Income for Canadians: From the COVID-19 Emergency to Financial Security for All."

== Selected academic publications ==
- Lavoie, J. G., Forget, E. L., Prakash, T., Dahl, M., Martens, P., & O’Neil, J. D. (2010). Have investments in on-reserve health services and initiatives promoting community control improved First Nations’ health in Manitoba?. Social science & medicine, 71(4), 717-724.
- Forget, E. L. (2011). The town with no poverty: The health effects of a Canadian guaranteed annual income field experiment. Canadian Public Policy, 37(3), 283–305.
- Forget, E. L. (2013). New questions, new data, old interventions: the health effects of a guaranteed annual income. Preventive Medicine, 57(6), 925–928.
- Cui, Y., Shooshtari, S., Forget, E. L., Clara, I., & Cheung, K. F. (2014). Smoking during pregnancy: findings from the 2009–2010 Canadian Community Health Survey. PLOS ONE, 9(1), e84640.
- Dimand, R., Dimand, M. A., & Forget, E. (2000). A biographical dictionary of women economists. Edward Elgar Publishing.
