= Peter Housden =

British civil servant (born 1950)

Sir Peter Housden KCB
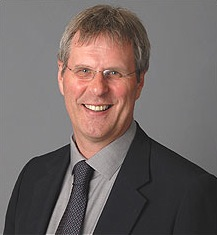

Permanent Secretary to the Scottish Government
- In office June 2010 – June 2015
- First Minister: Alex Salmond; Nicola Sturgeon
- Preceded by: Sir John Elvidge
- Succeeded by: Leslie Evans

Personal details
- Born: 7 December 1950 (age 75) Herefordshire, England
- Education: University of Essex

Sir Peter James Housden KCB (born 7 December 1950) is a former public official who worked in local and central government. He served as Permanent Secretary to the Scottish Government from June 2010 to June 2015. He was previously Permanent Secretary of the Department for Communities and Local Government.

== Early life ==
Housden was born on 7 December 1950 and was educated at Grove Comprehensive School, Market Drayton, Shropshire. He studied at the University of Essex where he graduated in 1973 with a First in Sociology. He began his career as a comprehensive school teacher in Shropshire and worked as an education officer in three county LEAs.

== Public Service ==
Housden was appointed as Director of Education in Nottinghamshire in 1991. In 1994, Peter was appointed as Chief Executive and in his seven years in that post managed Nottinghamshire County Council through Local Government Review and a wide-ranging programme of modernisation. In September 2000 he was seconded to the Audit Commission for six months to lead their work on the NHS national plan.

Housden joined the Department for Education and Skills in November 2001 as Director General for Schools. He had overall responsibility for all the Department's work in schools and in early years, and for current priorities on primary standards and secondary reform. He held this role until his appointment as Permanent Secretary of ODPM in 2005.

He was appointed Permanent Secretary to the Scottish Government from June 2010. In his role as Scotland's Permanent Secretary, Sir Peter was the principal policy adviser to the First Minister and the Cabinet and led significant work on the integration of public services and new approaches to leadership in public services workforces. He was a member of the UK Civil Service Board and its Senior Leadership Committee. As Permanent Secretary in Scotland, his impartiality over Scottish Independence was called into question with for example the Labour leader Iain Gray accusing Housden of having "gone native", but was consistently defended by the leaders of the UK Civil Service.

Peter Housden delivered the Frank Stacey Memorial Lecture at the 2013 Annual Conference of the Public Administration Committee of the Joint University Council of the Applied Social Sciences where he made the case for a distinct 'Scottish approach' to government.

Peter Housden is a Vice-President of the RNLI, having previously served as a Trustee.

Peter Housden was the Chair of The Civil Service Club. from 2017 to 2023.

== Publications ==
- 'The Passing of a Country Grammar School' (APS, 2015)
- 'Local Statesman' (Local Government Centre, Warwick University, 2000)
- 'Bucking the Market: LEAs and Special Needs' (NASEN, 1993).

== Honours and awards ==
Housden was appointed Knight Commander of the Order of the Bath (KCB) in the 2010 Birthday Honours.

Government offices
| Preceded by Dame Mavis McDonald | Permanent Secretary of the Office of the Deputy Prime Minister; 2005–2006 | Succeeded by himself as Permanent Secretary, Department for Communities and Local Government |
| Preceded by himself as Permanent Secretary, Office of the Deputy Prime Minister | Permanent Secretary of the Department for Communities and Local Government; 2006–2010 | Succeeded by Sir Bob Kerslake |
| Preceded by Sir John Elvidge | Permanent Secretary to the Scottish Government; 2010–2015 | Succeeded by Leslie Evans |
