= Eileen Mackay =

Scottish civil servant

Eileen Mackay CB FRSE FRSA FRSGS

Principal Finance Director of the Scottish Office
- In office 1992–1996

Personal details
- Born: Eileen Alison Mackay; 7 July 1943 (age 83) Helmsdale, Sutherland, Scotland
- Spouse: Muir Russell
- Education: University of Edinburgh
- Occupation: Civil servant

Eileen Alison Mackay CB FRSE FRSA FRSGS is a Scottish civil servant who worked in the Scottish Office, especially as their Principal Finance Director from 1992 until her retirement in 1996. Since then, she has worked in non-executive roles in the non-profit sector, including for the British Library, Royal Bank of Scotland, and Scottish Enterprise and in the courts of the University of Edinburgh and the University of the Highlands and Islands.

== Biography ==
Eileen Alison Mackay, the daughter of Alison Jack (née Ross) and Alexander William Mackay, was born on 7 July 1943 in Helmsdale, a village in eastern Sutherland where she was later raised. She was educated at Dingwall Academy and the University of Edinburgh, where she obtained her MA Honours degree in geography.

In 1965, she started working as a civil servant for Her Majesty's Government. With the exception of a start at the Ministry of Labour and a five-years period at the Cabinet Office and HM Treasury (1978-1983), she mainly worked at the Scottish Office. She served Under-Secretary for Housing in Scotland, and by the time of her retirement in 1996, she had been Principal Finance Director of the Scottish Office since 1992.

Mackay later began working in non-executive roles in the non-profit sector. She was part of the Royal Bank of Scotland and the Edinburgh Investment Trust boards of directors from 1996 until 2005. She has also been a board member for the British Library, Scottish Enterprise Lothian and Edinburgh, and Scottish Screen, a non-executive director of Moray Firth Maltings, a trustee for the Carnegie Trust for the Universities of Scotland, and chair of the David Hume Institute.

From 2009 until 2017, she was an independent member of the University of the Highlands and Islands (UHI) Court, where she also chaired the remuneration committee. In 2018, the UHI awarded her their first honorary doctorate. She has also served as part of the University of Edinburgh Court.

She was made Companion of the Order of the Bath at the 1996 Birthday Honours. She was elected Fellow of the Royal Society of Edinburgh in 2002. She is also a Fellow of the Chartered Banker Institute, Fellow of the Royal Scottish Geographical Society, and Fellow of the Royal Society of Arts.

She is the wife of civil servant Muir Russell.
