= Steve McIntyre =

Canadian writer (born c. 1947)

- Born: c. 1947
- Education: BSc (mathematics); MA (philosophy, politics, and economics)
- Alma mater: University of Toronto; University of Oxford
- Occupation: Mining consultant
- Known for: Critique of the hockey stick graph
- Website: Climate Audit

Stephen McIntyre (born c. 1947) is a Canadian mining exploration company director, a former minerals prospector and semi-retired mining consultant whose work has included statistical analysis. He is the founder and editor of Climate Audit, a blog which analyses and discusses climate data. He is a critic of the temperature record of the past 1000 years and the data quality of NASA's Goddard Institute for Space Studies. He has made statistical critiques, with economist Ross McKitrick, of the hockey stick graph which shows that the increase in late 20th century global temperatures is unprecedented in the past 1,000 years.

== Early life and education ==
McIntyre, a native of Ontario, attended the University of Toronto Schools, a college-preparatory school in Toronto, finishing first in the national high school mathematics competition of 1965. He went on to study mathematics at the University of Toronto and graduated with a Bachelor of Science degree in 1969. McIntyre then obtained a Commonwealth Scholarship to read philosophy, politics and economics (PPE) at Corpus Christi College, Oxford, graduating in 1971. Although he was offered a graduate scholarship, McIntyre decided not to pursue studies in mathematical economics at the Massachusetts Institute of Technology.

== Career ==
McIntyre started work for Noranda and worked for 30 years in the mineral business, the last part of these in the hard-rock mineral exploration as an officer or director of several public mineral exploration companies. He was the president and founder of Northwest Exploration Company Limited and a director of its parent company, Northwest Explorations Inc. When Northwest Explorations Inc. was taken over in 1998 by CGX Resources Inc. to form the oil and gas exploration company CGX Energy Inc., McIntyre ceased being a director. McIntyre was a strategic advisor for CGX in 2000 through 2003. McIntyre says that during his career his skills in statistical analysis enabled him to analyse mineral prospecting data and out-bet his rivals. He also occasionally worked as a government policy analyst, including a period at the federal Anti-Inflation Board.

Prior to 2003 he was an officer or director of several small public mineral exploration companies. He retired from full-time work, but still sometimes engaged in mining consultancy. He is an active squash player and once won a gold medal in the World Masters Games in squash doubles.

In April 2011, Trelawney Mining and Exploration Inc. of Toronto, Ontario announced the appointment of McIntyre to their board of directors and then later to chairman in June 2011. In September 2011, McIntyre was appointed to the board of directors of Augen Gold Corp., which was shortly acquired by Trelawney Mining and Exploration Inc. in November 2011. In October 2011, McIntyre was appointed to the board of directors of Southeast Asia Mining Corp. and later resigned in May 2012. Trelawney Mining and Exploration Inc. was acquired by Iamgold Corporation in June 2012.

== Hockey stick graph controversy ==
In 2002, McIntyre became interested in climate science after a leaflet from the Canadian government warning of the dangers of global warming was delivered to his residence. McIntyre states that he noticed discrepancies in climate science papers that reminded him of the false prospectus that had duped investors involved in the Bre-X gold mining scandal.

The Canadian government pamphlets were based on the IPCC Third Assessment Report section, which prominently displayed the hockey stick graph based on the 1999 reconstruction by Mann, Bradley and Hughes (MBH99). McIntyre began studying Mann's research, which had produced the graph, and met Ross McKitrick. McIntyre has remarked on how his suspicions of this graph were aroused: "In financial circles, we talk about a hockey stick curve when some investor presents you with a nice, steep curve in the hope of palming something off on you."

McIntyre & McKittrick's papers were cited by Senator Jim Inhofe and Representative Joe Barton to support their political criticisms of the MBH studies, and Representative Sherwood Boehlert requested the National Academy of Sciences in the United States to arrange an investigation. The outcome was the North Report, published in 2006, which endorsed the MBH studies with a few reservations. The principal component analysis method criticised by McIntyre & McKittrick had a small tendency to bias results so was not recommended, but it had little influence on the final reconstructions, and other methods produced similar results.

== ClimateAudit.org ==
McIntyre's blog has as a recurrent topic the struggle to obtain underlying data from peer reviewed papers. McIntyre has stated that he started Climate Audit so that he could defend himself against attacks being made at the climatology blog RealClimate. An earlier website, Climate2003, provided additional information for papers co-written by McIntyre and Ross McKitrick, including raw data and source code, and comments by McIntyre. On 26 October 2004 McIntyre commented on climate2003.com, "Maybe I'll start blogging some odds and ends that I'm working on. I'm going to post up some more observations on some of the blog criticisms." On 1 December Mann and nine other scientists launched the RealClimate website. On 2 February McIntyre set up his Climate Audit blog, having found difficulties with posting comments on the climate2003.com layout.

Climate Audit was co-winner of a 2007 Weblog Award for "Best Science Blog", receiving 20,000 votes in the online poll.

=== Auditing ===
Stephen McIntyre has been highlighted by the press, including The Wall Street Journal.

In 2007, McIntyre started auditing the various corrections made to temperature records, in particular those relating to the urban heat island effect. He discovered a discontinuity in some U.S. records in the Goddard Institute for Space Studies (GISS) dataset starting in January 2000. He emailed GISS advising them of the problem and within a couple of days GISS issued a new, corrected set of data and thanked McIntyre for "bringing to our attention that such an adjustment is necessary to prevent creating an artificial jump in year 2000". The adjustment reduced the average temperatures for the continental United States by about 0.15 °C during the years 2000-2006. Changes in other portions of the record did not exceed 0.03 °C; it made no discernible difference to the global mean anomalies.

McIntyre later commented:

My original interest in GISS adjustment procedures was not an abstract interest, but a specific interest in whether GISS adjustment procedures were equal to the challenge of "fixing" bad data. If one views the above assessment as a type of limited software audit (limited by lack of access to source code and operating manuals), one can say firmly that the GISS software had not only failed to pick up and correct fictitious steps of up to 1 deg C, but that GISS actually introduced this error in the course of their programming. According to any reasonable audit standards, one would conclude that the GISS software had failed this particular test. While GISS can (and has) patched the particular error that I reported to them, their patching hardly proves the merit of the GISS (and USHCN) adjustment procedures. These need to be carefully examined.

=== Role in the Climatic Research Unit controversy ===
Colby Cosh, writing for Maclean's magazine, believes McIntyre's criticisms of climate science are at the heart of the Climatic Research Unit email controversy in November–December 2009. McIntyre is mentioned over 100 times in the hacked Climatic Research Unit (CRU) emails. In the emails, one climate researcher dismisses him as a "bozo". Others speculate over his funding, and argue about whether to ignore or counterattack him, although, according to Cosh, some unnamed scientists acknowledge that his criticisms have merit.

The Associated Press analysis of the CRU e-mails stated: "Some e-mails said McIntyre's attempts to get original data from scientists are frivolous and meant more for harassment than doing good science. There are allegations that he would distort and misuse data given to him. McIntyre disagreed with how he is portrayed. 'Everything that I've done in this, I've done in good faith,' he said." The independent Science Assessment Panel's chair, Lord Oxburgh, said at a press conference that the repeated Freedom of Information (FOI) requests made by Steve McIntyre and others could have amounted to a campaign of harassment, and the issue of how FOI laws should be applied in an academic context remained unresolved.

In May 2010 BBC environment analyst Roger Harrabin wrote that McIntyre "arguably knows more about CRU science than anyone outside the unit — but none of the CRU inquiries has contacted him for input." In March McIntyre had submitted evidence to the Independent Climate Change Email Review (chaired by Sir Muir Russell), and points he raised were discussed in the Review report published on 7 July 2010. New Statesman named McIntyre as 32nd of its "50 People Who Matter 2010", citing his role in the email controversy. It said "The influence might not be positive, but there's no doubt he has shaped the debate."

== Selected publications ==
- McIntyre, Stephen; McKitrick, Ross (2003). "Corrections to the Mann et al. (1998) Proxy Data Base and Northern Hemispheric Average Temperature Series". Energy & Environment. 14 (6): 751–771. Bibcode:2003EnEnv..14..751M. CiteSeerX 10.1.1.168.1461. doi:10.1260/095830503322793632. S2CID 154585461. Archived from the original on 22 June 2013.
- McIntyre, Stephen; McKitrick, Ross (2005). "The M&M Critique of the MBH98 Northern Hemisphere Climate Index: Update and Implications". Energy & Environment. 16 (1): 69–100. Bibcode:2005EnEnv..16...69M. doi:10.1260/0958305053516226. S2CID 154090879. ;
- McIntyre, Stephen; McKitrick, Ross (2005). "Hockey sticks, principal components, and spurious significance". Geophysical Research Letters. 32 (3): L03710. Bibcode:2005GeoRL..32.3710M. doi:10.1029/2004GL021750.
- McIntyre, Stephen; McKitrick, Ross (2009). "Proxy inconsistency and other problems in millennial paleoclimate reconstructions". PNAS. 106 (6): E10. Bibcode:2009PNAS..106E..10M. doi:10.1073/pnas.0812509106. PMC 2647809. PMID 19188613.
- McKitrick, Ross; McIntyre, Stephen; Herman, Chad (2010). "Panel and multivariate methods for tests of trend equivalence in climate data series". Atmospheric Science Letters. 11 (4): 270–277. Bibcode:2010AtScL..11..270M. doi:10.1002/asl.290.
- O'Donnell, Ryan; Lewis, Nicholas; McIntyre, Steve; Condon, Jeff (2011). "Improved Methods for PCA-Based Reconstructions: Case Study Using the Steig et al. (2009) Antarctic Temperature Reconstruction". Journal of Climate. 24 (8): 2099–2115. Bibcode:2011JCli...24.2099O. doi:10.1175/2010JCLI3656.1. S2CID 129553222.
- McIntyre, Stephen; McKitrick, Ross (2011). "Discussion of: A statistical analysis of multiple temperature proxies: Are reconstructions of surface temperatures over the last 1000 years reliable?". Annals of Applied Statistics. 5 (1): 56–60. arXiv:1105.0524. Bibcode:2011arXiv1105.0524M. doi:10.1214/10-AOAS398L. S2CID 88511946.

== See also ==
- Global warming controversy
- Instrumental temperature record § Calculating the global temperature
