= Hourglass Federalism =

Economic and political theory

Hourglass Federalism is a theory about Canadian economic geography and political economy that has been promoted by Thomas J. Courchene of Queen's University. The thesis he proposes is that federal cutbacks of provincial transfers to social services since 1995 has caused significant fiscal imbalances. These funding cuts forced the provinces to make cutbacks in nearly every provincial jurisdiction, except healthcare because cutting healthcare funding would be political suicide, but this left almost every other provincial jurisdiction, including cities which are creations of the provinces, with reduced and often insufficient funding. However, in the meantime, the federal government has been providing greater funds to social programs but they have been bypassing the provinces and giving the money directly to cities or citizens. This allows the federal government to fund provincial jurisdictions directly causing the provinces to become "the squeezed middle of the division-of-powers hourglass".

Courchene defines Hourglass Federalism as "Ottawa's use of the spending power and other instruments to fiscally starve the provinces and then to make an end run around them to deal directly with cities and citizens alike, leaving the provinces of the squeezed middle of the division-of-powers hourglass".

== Making Inroads into Provincial Jurisdictions ==
The 1995 federal budget "folded the Canada Assistance Plan (CAP) and Established Program Financing (EPF) into the new Canada Social Transfer (CST) and proceeded to pare the Canada Health and Social Transfer (CHST) cash transfers from $18 billion to $11 billion". With these cuts, the federal government essentially "starved the provinces fiscally". Courchene notes that in an intriguing twist "these CHST cuts compromised virtually every provincial program except Medicare, since gutting medicare would mean certain electoral defeat for provincial governments. Hence, the provinces diverted money from everywhere else to medicare". Nevertheless, even though healthcare funding remained mostly unchanged "the inevitable result was that the provinces had to starve other policy areas, so much so that citizens and cities alike welcomed federal funding in these cash-starved areas". This is what provided the inroad for the federal government to take a more direct role in funding provincial jurisdictions. Whereas previously the federal government would mostly establish conditional transfer funds for social programs to the provinces to distribute to their citizens and cities, where the federal government could attach conditions the provinces would have to meet to receive the funding, providing a round about way for the federal government to influence provincial jurisdictions. Now under this proposed hourglass federalism model the federal government is taking a more direct route and directly dealing with citizens and cities and transferring the funds for provincial programs directly to them.

What drives this trend of hourglass federalism according to Courchene is "Ottawa's superior fiscal position and its creative exercise of the federal spending power". This fiscal superiority stems from the fact that "Ottawa draws in way more in taxes from Canadians than it spends on programs that fall under federal jurisdiction". Since federal government balanced their books in 1997, they have since then had many years of surplus, "Ottawa has used the fiscal dividend to move into areas of exclusive provincial jurisdiction, such as cities and education, while the cash-starved provinces look on, helpless to spend any new money in their own constitutional domains".

== The New Economic Order ==
Courchene attributes this enhanced interest in provincial jurisdiction by the federal government to "the new economic order (globalization and the knowledge information revolution)". Courchene accredits three changes associated with this new economic order that have the federal government so concerned with provincial jurisdictions. The first change is "the shift from a resource-based society and economy to a human-capital or knowledge-based society and economy". This shift means that more money and effort needs to be put into education, which is a provincial jurisdiction. Secondly is "the emergence of global city regions (GCRs) as the dynamic motors of the new economy". With this increased role of GCRs the federal government obviously would want to have a good rapport with the cities, also since the state of these GCRs has a large impact on Canada's competitiveness, especially with the United States, the federal government would see an interest in maintaining and improving the necessary functions of the cities. Finally yet importantly, is the argument that "the essence of nation-building and electoral salience have also shifted away from resource-based mega projects and towards citizen-driven infrastructure and policies in areas like health, education and income distribution". It just so happens that these shifts in national interests for most citizens come from traditional provincial jurisdictions so to maintain their significance and electoral success among Canadians the federal government had to seek-out ways to influence these provincial jurisdictions.

Examples of some federal programs designed to make these inroads into cities and with citizens include the Canada Child Tax Benefit, the Canada Millennium Scholarship Foundation, Goods and Services Tax (GST) exemption for cities, and the promise to share federal gas tax to assist with city infrastructure improvements.

== See also ==
- Federalism
