= Mavis McDonald =

British academic and civil servant

Dame Mavis McDonald, DCB (born 23 October 1944) is a British academic and civil servant. She served as Permanent Secretary, Office of the Deputy Prime Minister and was named Dame Commander of the Order of the Bath (DCB) in 2004.

== Career ==
In 1966, after completing her BSc in Economics and Politics at the London School of Economics, she joined the Ministry of Housing and Local Government. From 1995 to 2000, she served as Director General at the DOE and then the department for the Environment, Transport and the Regions (DETR). She was named Permanent Secretary of the Cabinet Office, responsible for the Modernising Government agenda (2000-2002). She retired from the Civil Service in 2005. Although she never attended Birkbeck College she was named as one of the college's independent Governors.

McDonald's affiliations can be found here.

As an Under Secretary in the Department of the Environment on 2 September 1991 Mavis McDonald signed the Order to Dissolve Telford Development Corporation.

https://www.legislation.gov.uk/uksi/1991/1980/made

Government offices
Preceded by Sir Brian Bender	Permanent Secretary at the Cabinet; 2000–2002	Succeeded by Sir David Omand
Preceded by Sir Richard Mottram as Permanent Secretary, Department for Transport, Local Government and the Regions	Permanent Secretary at the Office of the Deputy Prime Minister; 2002–2005	Succeeded by Sir Peter Housden
