= Jesse Winter =

Jesse Winter is a Canadian freelance journalist and photographer. He was the winner of the 2024 Canadian Journalism Foundation's Edward Burtynsky Award for Climate Photojournalism. He has written and photographed for the Globe and Mail, Reuters,The Guardian, as well as other publications. His 2026 book, Wild Fire: Dispatches from a Country Ablaze, covers the major wildfires of the mid-2020's in western Canada. Winter also teaches in the journalism program at Langara College in Vancouver, British Columbia.

== Early life ==
Winter was a competitive cross-country skier, competing internationally for Canada. He completed journalism programs at Langara College and Carleton University.

== Journalism career ==
Winter began working as a journalist in Yellowknife, Northwest Territories, covering sports for Northern News Services and the Yellowknifer. Winter was part of a team of New York Times photographers nominated for a Pulitizer Prize for their work covering the 2021 floods in British Columbia's Fraser Valley. Three photographs taken by Winter during the catastrophic 2023 wildfire season in Canada were selected by the Canadian Journalism Foundation for their Edward Burtynsky Award for Climate Journalism in 2024.

Winter recorded his experiences covering wildfires in a non-fiction book titled Wild Fire: Dispatches from a Country Ablaze, which was published by Harper Collins in 2026. The book covers three destructive Canadian wildfires: the Bush Creek East fire and Northwest Territories fires in 2023, and 2024's Jasper wildfire. Wild Fire was shortlisted for the 2026 Balsillie Prize for Public Policy.
