= Balsillie Prize for Public Policy =

Annual Canadian literary award for works on public policy

The Balsillie Prize for Public Policy is an annual Canadian literary award, presented to honour the year's best non-fiction work on public policy issues. Created in 2021, the award is presented by the Writers' Trust of Canada, and sponsored by technology investor Jim Balsillie.

== Nominees and recipients ==
Year	Author	Title	Ref
2021	Dan Breznitz	Innovation in Real Places: Strategies for Prosperity in an Unforgiving World	
2021	Gregor Craigie	On Borrowed Time: North America's Next Big Quake	
2021	André Picard	Neglected No More: The Urgent Need to Improve the Lives of Canada's Elders in the Wake of a Pandemic	
2021	Jody Wilson-Raybould	Indian in the Cabinet: Speaking Truth to Power	
2022	John Lorinc	Dream States: Smart Cities, Technology, and the Pursuit of Urban Utopias	
2022	Jean Marmoreo, Johanna Schneller	The Last Doctor: Lessons in Living from the Front Lines of Medical Assistance in Dying	
2022	Kent Roach	Canadian Policing: Why and How It Must Change	
2022	Vaclav Smil	How the World Really Works: The Science Behind How We Got Here and Where We're Going	
2022	Kim Stanton	Reconciling Truths: Reimagining Public Inquiries in Canada	
2023	David R. Samson	Our Tribal Future: How to Channel Our Foundational Human Instincts into a Force for Good	
2023	Ajay Agrawal, Joshua Gans, Avi Goldfarb	Power and Prediction: The Disruptive Economics of Artificial Intelligence	
2023	Michelle Good	Truth Telling: Seven Conversations About Indigenous Life in Canada	
2023	Ryan Manucha	Booze, Cigarettes, and Constitutional Dust-Ups: Canada's Quest for Interprovincial Free Trade	
2023	Max Wyman	The Compassionate Imagination: How the Arts Are Central to a Functioning Democracy	
2024	Wendy H. Wong	We, the Data: Human Rights in the Digital Age	
2024	Gregor Craigie	Our Crumbling Foundation: How We Solve Canada's Housing Crisis	
2024	Christopher Pollon	Pitfall: The Race to Mine the World's Most Vulnerable Places	
2024	M. G. Vassanji	Nowhere, Exactly: On Identity and Belonging	
2025	Vince Beiser	Power Metal: The Race for the Resources That Will Shape the Future	
2025	Vass Bednar, Denise Hearn	The Big Fix: How Companies Capture Markets and Harm Canadians	
2025	Pamela Cross	And Sometimes They Kill You: Confronting the Epidemic of Intimate Partner Violence	
2025	Stephen J. A. Ward	Irrational Publics and the Fate of Democracy	
2026	Dennis Molinaro	Under Assault: Interference and Espionage in China’s Secret War Against Canada	
2026	Moira Welsh	The Astonishing Lives of Older Women: How to Create Pleasure Over Peril in Peak Longevity	
2026	Rick Westhead	We Breed Lions: Confronting Canada’s Troubled Hockey Culture	
2026	Jesse Winter	Wild Fire: Dispatches from a Country Ablaze	
2026	Tim Wu	The Age of Extraction: How Tech Platforms Conquered the Economy and Threaten Our Future Prosperity	

== See also ==
- Donner Prize
