= Finance and Corporate Services Directorates =

The Scottish Government Finance and Corporate Services Directorates were a set of directorates of the Scottish Government. They were responsible for delivering ministerial support, human resources, legal services and procurement to the other directorates. In December 2010 these functions were taken on by the Governance and Communities Directorate and the Finance Directorate.

== Directorates ==
- Communications
- HR and Corporate Services
- Office of the Scottish Parliamentary Counsel
- Procurement
- Public Services Reform
- Scottish Government Legal Directorates
