= Taken by Storm =

2002 book by Christopher Essex and Ross McKitrick

Taken By Storm: The Troubled Science, Policy and Politics of Global Warming
- Author: Christopher Essex, Ross McKitrick
- Publication date: 2002

Taken By Storm: The Troubled Science, Policy and Politics of Global Warming is a 2002 book about the global warming controversy by Christopher Essex and Ross McKitrick. The authors argue that politicians and others claim far more certainty than is justified by the science. The authors also argue that public policy discussions have abandoned science and resorted to ad hominem attacks.

Taken by Storm was one of two runners up for the 2002 Donner Prize for the best book on Canadian public policy.
