= Benjamin Higgins =

Benjamin Higgins (1912–2001) was a Canadian development economists especially, noted for his work in and on Indonesia during the 1950s. Perhaps his greatest practical achievement was his role in producing Indonesia's first Five-Year Plan (1956–60). ,And his most influential academic achievement was his textbook Economic Development, one of the earliest in the field. After a degree in economics and political science at the University of Western Ontario he went to LSE to do an MSc in Economics. It was there he met many leading economists including Friedrich Hayek, John Hicks, Nicholas Kaldor and Paul Rosenstein-Rodan. After his time at LSE he moved to the University of Minnesota, to do his PhD supervised by Alvin Hansen. During WW2 he worked in several U.S. government agencies, gaining practical experience in planning and public investment and then went on to work at McGill University and with the ILO. His first book ‘’Public Investment and Full Employment’’ emerged from this period and reflected both Keynesian theory and practical planning experience. In 1952 he went to Indonesia and worked with several leading political figures (including the finance minister Sumitro Djojohadikusumo, the governor of the Bank of Indonesia Sjafruddin Prawiranegara, and the economic planner Djuanda Kartawidjaja). He was heavily involved in the establishment of the State Planning Bureau and in the production of Indonesia's First Five-Year Plan. During his time in Indonesia he worked with an interdisciplinary team that included not only economists and political policy makers but also social anthropologists (notably including Clifford Geertz.

In 1989 he published an autobiography The Road Less Travelled: A Development Economist’s Quest. In 1992 a festchrift for Higgins was produced Equity and Efficiency in Economic Development: Essays in Honour of Benjamin Higgins (eds D. Savoie and I. Brecher). The listed contributors included many noted economists, including Irma Adelman, Mark Blaug, Kenneth Boulding, John Chipman, Andre Gunder Frank, Murray Kemp, Robin Marris, Richard Musgrave, Walt W. Rostow and Paul Streeten.

== Selected publications ==
- (1946) Public Investment and Full Employment (ILO).
- (1959) Economic Development (revised 1968, Norton).
- (1957) Indonesia's Stabilization and Development (Institute of Pacific Relations).
- (1963) Indonesia: The Crisis of the Millstones (with Jean Higgins).
