= Mark Jaccard =

Canadian energy economist (1955-)

Mark Kenneth Jaccard
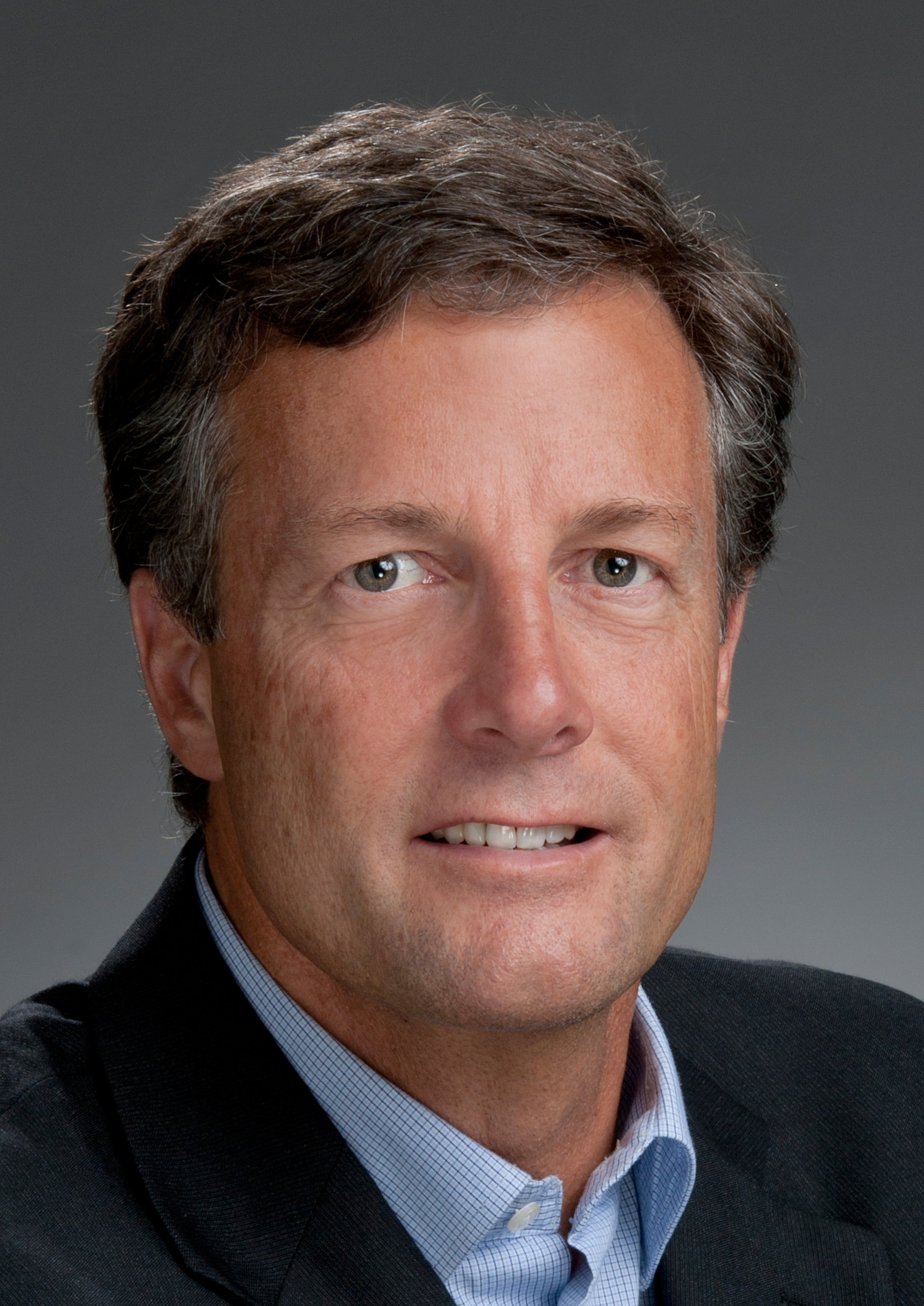
- Mark Jaccard in 2010
- Born: April 12, 1955 (age 71); Vancouver, British Columbia
- Occupations: Energy economist; author

Academic background
- Education: Université Grenoble Alpes

Mark Kenneth Jaccard (born April 12, 1955) is a Canadian energy economist and author. He develops and applies models that assess sustainability policies for energy and material. Jaccard is a professor of sustainable energy in the School of Resource and Environmental Management (REM) at Simon Fraser University.

== Biography ==
Jaccard was born in Vancouver, British Columbia. His PhD is from the Energy Economics and Policy Institute at the University of Grenoble (now called Université Grenoble Alpes). Jaccard has been a professor at Simon Fraser University since 1986, where he teaches courses in environment and resource economics, sustainable energy and materials, and energy and materials economic and policy modeling. His research focuses on the development and application of energy-economy-emissions models that simulate the likely effects of sustainable energy policies. He has over 100 academic publications. He advises governments, industry and non-government organizations around the world.

Jaccard served as chair and CEO of the B.C. Utilities Commission (1992 to 1997), on the Intergovernmental Panel on Climate Change (1993–96, 2008–09), and on the China Council for International Cooperation on Environment and Development (1996–2001, 2008–09). In his latest work for the China Council, he was co-chair of a task force on sustainable use of coal, reporting to the Premier of China. In 2007-12 he served as convening lead author for energy policy in the production of the Global Energy Assessment. He served on Canada's National Roundtable on the Environment and the Economy (2006–09) and since 2006 has been a research fellow at the C.D. Howe Institute. In 2005, his book, Sustainable Fossil Fuels won the Donner Prize for top policy book in Canada. In 2008, he was named Academic of the Year by the Association of British Columbia faculty members. In 2009, he was named a Fellow of the Royal Society of Canada for his lifetime research. In 2012, Jaccard was a recipient of Canada's Clean16 and Clean 50 awards, in recognition of his contributions to sustainability education in Canada. In 2014, he received Simon Fraser University's first Professor Award for Sustainability, and in that year was also appointed to a distinguished chair as SFU University Professor. In 2025, he was named to the Order of British Columbia.

== Education ==
- Ph.D.: University of Grenoble, Department of Economics / Institute of Energy Economics and Policy, 1987.
- Masters of Natural Resources Management: Simon Fraser University, 1983.
- Bachelor of Arts: Simon Fraser University, 1977.

== Publications ==
Books

- Mark Jaccard. The Citizen's Guide to Climate Success, 2020. Cambridge University Press.
- Jeffrey Simpson, Mark Jaccard and Nic Rivers. Hot Air: Meeting Canada's Climate Change Challenge, 2007. McClelland and Stewart.
- Mark Jaccard. Sustainable Fossil Fuels: An Unusual Suspect in the Quest for Clean and Enduring Energy, 2005. Cambridge University Press.
- Mark Jaccard, John Nyboer and Bryn Sadownik. The Cost of Climate Policy, 2002. UBC Press. Winner of the Best Policy Book in Canada award of the National Policy Research Initiative, and shortlisted for the Donner award for best policy book in Canada.

Recent publications

- Bataille, C., Melton, N. and M. Jaccard, 2014, "Policy uncertainty and diffusion of carbon capture and storage in an optimal region," Climate Policy.
- Rhodes, K., Axsen, J. and M. Jaccard, 2014, "Does climate policy require well-informed citizen support?" Global Environmental Change.
- Palen, W. et al., 2014, "Consider the global impacts of oil pipelines," Nature, V.510, 465–467.
- Liu, Z., Mao, X., Tu, J. and M. Jaccard, 2014, "A comparative assessment of economic-incentive and command-and-control instruments for air pollution and CO2 control in *China’s iron and steel sector," Journal of Environmental Management.
- Jaccard, M. 2013, "The Accidental Activist", The Walrus.
- Jaccard, M. and S. Goldberg, 2013, "Technology assumptions and climate policy: The interrelated effects of US electricity-transport policy in EMF 24 using CIMS-US." The Energy Journal.
- Rhodes, K. and M. Jaccard, 2013, "A tale of two climate policies: Political-economy of British Columbia’s carbon tax and clean electricity standard." Canadian Public Policy.
- Jaccard, M., 2012, "The political acceptability of carbon taxes: lessons from British Columbia," In J. Milne and M. Andersen, Handbook of Research on Environmental Taxation Elsevier.
- Johansson, T. (et al., including M. Jaccard), 2012, "Global Energy Assessment – Summary for Policy Makers," In Johansson, T., Patwardhan, A., Nakicenovic, N. and L. Gomez-Echeverri (eds.) The Global Energy Assessment: Towards a Sustainable Future, Cambridge: Cambridge University Press.
- Jaccard, M. (convening lead author) et al., 2012, "Energy Policies: Objectives and Instruments," Chapter 22 in Johansson, T., Patwardhan, A., Nakicenovic, N. and L. Gomez-Echeverri (eds.) The Global Energy Assessment: Towards a Sustainable Future, Cambridge: Cambridge University Press.
- Beugin, D. and M. Jaccard, 2012, "Statistical simulation to estimate uncertain behavioral parameters of hybrid energy-economy models," Environmental Modeling and Assessment.
- Jaccard, M. and J. Tu, 2011, "Show some enthusiasm, but not too much: carbon capture and storage development prospects in China," Global Environmental Change, V21, 402–412.
- Rivers, N. and M. Jaccard, 2011, "Retrospective evaluation of electric utility demand-side management programs in Canada," The Energy Journal, V.32(4–5), 93–116.
- Rivers, N. and M. Jaccard, 2011, "Intensity-based climate change policies in Canada," Canadian Public Policy, V36(4), 409–428.
- Murphy, R. and M. Jaccard, 2011, "Energy efficiency and the cost of GHG abatement: A comparison of bottom-up and hybrid models for the US," Energy Policy.
- Mitchell, C. (et al., including M. Jaccard), 2011, "Policy, Financing and Implementation," In Edenhofer et al., IPCC Special Report on Renewable Energy Sources and Climate Change Mitigation Cambridge: Cambridge University Press.
- Murphy, R. and M. Jaccard, 2011, "Modeling efficiency standards and a carbon tax: Simulations for the US using a hybrid approach," The Energy Journal.
- Jaccard, M., Melton, N. and J. Nyboer, 2011, "Institutions and processes for scaling up renewables: Run-of-river hydropower in British Columbia," Energy Policy.
- Peters, J., Bataille, C., Rivers, N. and M. Jaccard, 2010, "Taxing emissions, not income: How to moderate the regional impact of federal climate policy in Canada," CD Howe Institute, No.314, 24 pages
- Sharp, J., Jaccard, M. and D. Keith, 2009, "Anticipating public attitudes to underground CO2 storage," International Journal of Greenhouse Gas Control.
- Axsen, J., Mountain, D. and M. Jaccard, 2009 "Combining stated and revealed choice research to simulate preference dynamics: the case of hybrid-electric vehicles. Resource and Energy Economics.
- Jaccard, M. 2009 "Peak oil and market feedbacks: Chicken Little versus Dr. Pangloss," in T. Homer-Dixon (ed.) Carbon Shift, Random House.
- Mau, P., Eyzaguirre J., Jaccard, M., Collins-Dodd, C. and K. Tiedemann, 2008, "The neighbor effect: simulating dynamics in consumer preferences for new vehicle technologies," Ecological Economics.
- Jaccard, M., 2007, Designing Canada's Low-Carb Diet: Options for Effective Climate Policy, C.D. Howe Institute Benefactors’ Lecture.
- Jaccard, M. and N. Rivers, 2006 "Heterogeneous Capital Stocks and Optimal Timing for CO2 Abatement, Resource and Energy Economics.
- Rivers, N. and M. Jaccard, 2006, "Choice of Environmental Policy in the Presence of Learning by Doing," Energy Economics.
- Rivers, N. and M. Jaccard, 2006, "Useful Models for Simulating Policies to Induce Technological Change." Energy Policy.
