= Darrell Bricker =

Canadian writer and pollster

Dr. Darrell Bricker is a Canadian author, pollster, public speaker, political scientist and political commentator.

== Education ==
Bricker completed his B.A. in 1983 and his M.A. in 1984, both at Wilfrid Laurier University. While Bricker was completing his B.A. studies, he began to specialize in research, polling, and analysis methods. This led to further specialization during his M.A. and Ph.D. He completed his Ph.D. at Carleton University in 1989.

== Career ==
After completing his Ph.D. at Carleton University in 1989, Bricker was hired in the Office of Prime Minister Brian Mulroney as the Director of Public Opinion Research. After a year in the Prime Minister's Office, Bricker was hired by the Angus Reid Group, a polling and analysis company that eventually merged with Ipsos.

Bricker is the current Global CEO of Ipsos Public Affairs, a polling, research, marketing, and analysis company. As a pollster, Bricker is regularly called upon to give media commentary on a variety of topics, including Canadian politics, social demographics, immigration, military policy, industry and business affairs, and federal and provincial affairs. Bricker regularly writes columns for the National Post and The Globe and Mail. He has also published several academic articles and six books. All six books have become Canadian bestsellers.

Bricker also holds numerous other positions:

- Senior Fellow, Centre for International Governance Innovation
- Board Member, Laurier Institute for the Study of Public Opinion and Policy
- Member, Fundraising Cabinet, Fort York's Visitor Centre
- Member, Royal Canadian Military Institute
- Advisor, Economic Development Committee, Business Advisory Group for the City of Toronto
- Member, American Association of Public Opinion Research
- (Former) Doctoral Fellow, Social Science and Humanities Research Council

== Personal life ==
Bricker lives in Toronto with his wife, Nina, and his daughter, Emily.

== Awards and honors ==
- In 2010, The Queen's York Rangers, a Canadian Forces armoured reconnaissance reserve unit in Toronto, appointed Bricker as an honorary colonel. Honorary colonels are appointed by the Minister of National Defence for being "distinguished Canadians who have contributed to the country through business, politics, the arts, sports, education, entertainment, or through previous military service."
- In 2010, he also received an Honorary LL.D. from Wilfrid Laurier University in 2010.

== Bibliography ==
- Searching for Certainty: Inside the New Canadian Mindset, DoubleDay (2001)
- What Canadians Think About Almost Everything, DoubleDay (2005)
- We Know What You’re Thinking, HarperCollins (2009)
- Canuckology, HarperCollins (2010)
- The Big Shift: The Seismic Change in Canadian Politics, Business, and Culture and What It Means for Our Future (with John Ibbitson), HarperCollins (2013)
- Empty Planet: The Shock of Global Population Decline (with John Ibbitson), McClelland & Stewart, 2019
