= Dan Breznitz =

American-Canadian academic

- Education: Hebrew University of Jerusalem (BA) Massachusetts Institute of Technology (PhD)
- Occupation: University Professor
- Website: https://munkschool.utoronto.ca/person/dan-breznitz

Dan Breznitz is a Canadian interdisciplinary scholar whose main intellectual focus is on purposeful social change, choice, and human agency, especially around innovation. Breznitz’s work has received awards and been published in multiple disciplines, such as public policy, history, political science, global and international affairs, regional studies, sociology, and law. As of 2026 he holds the rank of University Professor of the University of Toronto, where he also serves as the Munk Chair of Innovation Studies at the Munk School of Global Affairs & Public Policy, and the Co-Director of the Innovation Policy Lab. In 2019 he co-founded and co-directed (until 2025) the Canadian Institute for Advanced Research’s (CIFAR) program: Innovation, Equity & the Future of Prosperity.

== Education ==
Breznitz graduated from the Hebrew University of Jerusalem. He completed his doctoral studies at the Massachusetts Institute of Technology (MIT), with research in comparative political economy and industrial change.

== Career ==
Breznitz served on the faculty of the Georgia Institute of Technology (Georgia Tech), with appointments spanning international affairs, public policy, business, and leadership roles in innovation-policy programs and the strategy group. He has also held visiting appointments, including periods as a visiting scholar at Stanford University and visiting professorial fellowships at the Collegio Carlo Alberto in Turin and Ca' Foscari University of Venice.

Breznitz joined the University of Toronto in 2013 and has held senior academic roles at the Munk School of Global Affairs & Public Policy including appointment as the first Munk Chair at the Munk School and serving as the Co-Director of the Innovation Policy Lab. In 2021, he was elected a University Professor, the university’s highest scholarly rank.

His work has included research and public engagement on place-based economic development strategies, innovation agencies and policy design, technology standards, social innovation policy, social network policies, the socio-economic-political distributional implications of innovation and technological change, the role of ideas, and enclave economies.

Breznitz has advised governments, leading global institutions, development banks and fortune 100 corporations on innovation and economic development policy. He served as the Clifford Clarke Economist (the primer external economic adviser to the Federal Ministry of Finance) at Canada’s Department of Finance (2021–2022). He has also served on multiple boards and participated in many national and international policy discussions on innovation, industrial strategy, economic growth, and economic distribution through advisory roles and public-facing lectures and events.

=== Research ===
Breznitz’s research examines how communities and economies build innovation capacity, how industrial and innovation policy interact with global production networks, how policy choices influence the distribution of opportunities and outcomes, and how the political economy of innovation shapes social goals and economic equity in various places. He is also known for his pioneering work on the function of innovation agencies and the socio-economic and political distributional impact of innovation, as well as on the power of ideas and social networks. His work utilizes multiple methods, and has been published in various disciplines and languages, across both academic and policy audiences. In it he emphasises human agency, the ways in which innovation strategies vary across regions and sectors, and how successful economic development depends on aligning policy tools with local capabilities and institutional contexts, as well on the specific local goals toward which they are applied.

== Selected publications ==
=== Books ===
- Breznitz, Dan (2007). Innovation and the state: political choice and strategies for growth in Israel, Taiwan, and Ireland. New Haven: Yale university press. ISBN 978-0-300-16833-4. Winner of the Don K. Price for the Best Book in Science and Technology Politics given by the American Political Science Association
- Breznitz, Dan; Murphree, Michael (2014). Run of the red queen: Government, Innovation, Globalization, and Economic Growth in China. New Haven London: Yale University Press. ISBN 978-0-300-21195-5., winner of the Susan Strange Best Book in International Studies Award by the British International Studies Association
- Breznitz, Dan (2021). Innovation in real places: strategies for prosperity in an unforgiving world. New York: Oxford university press. ISBN 978-0-19-750812-1. As of 2026 the only book to receive both major Canadian public policy book awards – the Donner Prize and the inaugural Balsillie Prize for Public Policy given by the Writers’ Trust of Canada

Breznitz has also edited volumes and written over sixty peer reviewed articles and chapters in academic journals in the social sciences, humanities, management, and engineering as well as numerous public policy outlets. His Op-eds appeared in leading national and international outlets, from The New York Times to the Globe and Mail, Harvard Business Review, Barron’s, and The Economist.
