= William R. Morrison (historian) =

Canadian historian of the Canadian North (born 1942)

William Robert Morrison (born January 26, 1942) is a Canadian historian of the Canadian North.

Born in Hamilton, Ontario, Morrison received a Bachelor of Arts (history) degree from McMaster University in 1963 and a Master of Arts (history) from the same university the following year. He studied under Morris Zaslow, the senior northern historian in the country at the time, at the University of Western Ontario, receiving his PhD in 1973. His thesis was entitled, "The Mounted Police on Canada's Northern Frontier, 1895 - 1924."

After a short stint with the National Historic Sites Service in Ottawa, Morrison was hired at Brandon University in 1969, remaining there until 1989. He subsequently become professor of history and director of the Lakehead Centre for Northern Studies (1989–1992), founding dean of research and graduate studies at the University of Northern British Columbia (1992–1997) and professor of history, UNBC, retiring in 2010 as professor emeritus. He served as a visiting professor at the University of Victoria in 1988–1989 and distinguished visiting professor at Duke University in 2001 and 2002. Morrison also served on the board of directors of the Canadian Institute for Historical Microreproductions (and as president from 1999 to 2001), on the executive committee for the Association of Canadian Universities for Northern Studies and chair, Northern History Group of the Canadian Historical Association.

Morrison received an honorary degree (Doctor of Literature) from Brandon University in 2007.

Morrison has authored or co-authored 8 books and edited or co-edited 5 books. Among his best known works are True North: The Yukon and Northwest Territories (Oxford, 1998), The Alaska Highway in World War II (University of Oklahoma Press, 1992), The Sinking of the Princess Sophia: Taking the North Down With Her (Oxford, 1991), Land of the Midnight Sun: A History of the Yukon revised edition (McGill-Queen's University Press, 2005), and Showing the Flag, The Mounted Police and Canadian Sovereignty in the North, 1894 – 1925 (UBC Press, 1985).
