= Governance (journal) =

Academic journal

- Discipline: Political science, public administration
- Language: English
- Edited by: Paolo Graziano; Adam Sheingate

Publication details
- History: 1988-present
- Publisher: Wiley-Blackwell on behalf of the IPSA Structure and Organization of Government Committee
- Frequency: Quarterly
- Impact factor: 3.833 (2017)

Standard abbreviations
- ISO 4: Governance

Indexing
- ISSN: 0952-1895 (print); 1468-0491 (web)
- LCCN: 90649970
- OCLC no.: 39069774

Links
- Journal homepage; Online access; Online archive

Governance is a quarterly journal published by the Structure and Organization of Government Committee (Research Committee 27) of the International Political Science Association. It covers the theoretical and practical discussion of executive politics, public policy, administration, and the organization of the state. According to the Journal Citation Reports, the journal has a 2017 impact factor of 3.833, ranking it 4th out of 169 journals in the category "Political Science" and 3rd out of 47 journals in the category "Public Administration".

The journal's co-editors are Paolo Graziano and Adam Sheingate. The book review editor is Clay G. Wescott.

== Editors Emeritus ==
- Michael Atkinson, University of Saskatchewan
- Colin Campbell, University of British Columbia
- B. Guy Peters, University of Pittsburgh
- Jon Pierre, University of Gothenburg
- Bert Rockman, Purdue University
- Graham K. Wilson, Boston University
- Michael Barzelay, London School of Economics

== See also ==
- List of political science journals
