= John Ibbitson =

Canadian journalist (born 1955)

- Born: 1955 (age 70–71); Gravenhurst, Ontario, Canada
- Education: University of Toronto (B.A.); University of Western Ontario (M.A.)
- Writing career
- Genres: Fiction, non-fiction
- Subjects: Canadian politics, Young adult literature
- Notable works: 1812; Promised Land; Loyal No More; The Polite Revolution; Open & Shut; The Big Shift (co-author); Stephen Harper
- Notable awards: Governor General's Award for English-language children's literature, Shaughnessy Cohen Prize for Political Writing

John Ibbitson (born 1955) is a Canadian writer. Since 1999, he has been a political writer and columnist for The Globe and Mail.

== Early life and education ==
Ibbitson grew up in Gravenhurst, Ontario. He graduated from the University of Toronto in 1979 with a B.A. in English.

In 1987, Ibbitson entered the University of Western Ontario. In 1988, he graduated with an M.A in journalism.

== Career ==
After university, he pursued a career as a playwright, his most notable play being Mayonnaise, which debuted in December 1980 at the Phoenix Theatre in Toronto, Ontario. The play went on to national production and was adapted to a TV broadcast in 1983. Ibbitson lived in London, England during this era.

In the mid-1980s, Ibbitson switched over to writing young adult fiction, including the science fiction novel Starcrosser (1990). He also wrote two full-length novels, 1812: Jeremy's War and The Night Hazel Came to Town. The Landing followed in 2008 - a winner of the 2008 Governor General's Award for English-language children's literature. Apart from the latter Ibbitson has been nominated for several awards for other works, including a Governor General's Award nomination for 1812. Hazel received a nomination for the Trillium Book Award and the City of Toronto Book Award. His journalism has also been nominated for a National Newspaper Award.

In 1988, he joined the Ottawa Citizen, where he worked as a city reporter and columnist. He covered Ontario politics from 1995 to 2001, working for the Ottawa Citizen, Southam News, the National Post, and The Globe and Mail. In 2001, Ibbitson accepted the post of Washington bureau chief at The Globe and Mail, returning to Canada one year later, in 2002, to take up the post of political affairs columnist. In 2007, he moved back to Washington as a columnist. In 2009, he returned to Ottawa as bureau chief. In 2010, he became the paper's chief political writer. In that role, he has also frequently appeared on Canadian television news programs as a pundit and political analyst. In 2015, he became writer-at-large.

In recent years, Ibbitson has focused on writing political books, often in tandem with pollster Darrell Bricker. In 2013, Ibbitson and Bricker co-authored the book The Big Shift: The Seismic Change in Canadian Politics, Business, and Culture and What It Means for Our Future. In January 2014, Ibbitson began a one-year leave of absence from the Globe to serve as a senior fellow at the Centre for International Governance Innovation and to work on a biography of Prime Minister Stephen Harper. His biography on Harper was published in August 2015. In 2016, the book won the Shaughnessy Cohen Prize for Political Writing. In 2019, Ibbitson and Bricker co-authored the book Empty Planet: The Shock of Global Population Decline. It was published separately in the United States, Great Britain, and Canada. It was also translated into Chinese, Spanish, Japanese, and Korean.

== Personal life ==
Ibbitson is married to Grant Burke.

== Awards and honours ==
- In 2008, the Canada Council bestowed upon Ibbitson the Governor General's Award for English-language children's literature for his book The Landing.
- In 2016, a jury selected by the Writers' Trust of Canada bestowed upon Ibbitson the Shaughnessy Cohen Prize for Political Writing. Ibbitson won for his biography, Stephen Harper, on the Canadian prime minister.

== Bibliography ==
=== Non-fiction ===
- Promised Land: Inside the Mike Harris Revolution (Prentice Hall, 1997)
- Loyal No More: Ontario's Struggle for a Separate Destiny (HarperCollins, 2001)
- The Polite Revolution: Perfecting the Canadian Dream (McClelland & Stewart, 2005)
- Open & Shut: Why America Has Barack Obama and Canada Has Stephen Harper (McClelland & Stewart, 2009)
- The Big Shift: The Seismic Change in Canadian Politics, Business, and Culture and What It Means for Our Future, with Darrell Bricker (HarperCollins, 2013)
- Stephen Harper (McClelland & Stewart, (2015)
- Empty Planet: The Shock of Global Population Decline, with Darrell Bricker (McClelland & Stewart, 2019)
- The Duel: Diefenbaker, Pearson and the Making of Modern Canada (Signal, 2023)

=== Fiction ===
- Jeremy's War: 1812 (Maxwell Macmillan, 1991)
- The Night Hazel Came to Town (Maxwell Macmillan, 1993)
- The Landing (KidsCan Press, 2008)
