= Ken Coates (historian) =

Canadian historian

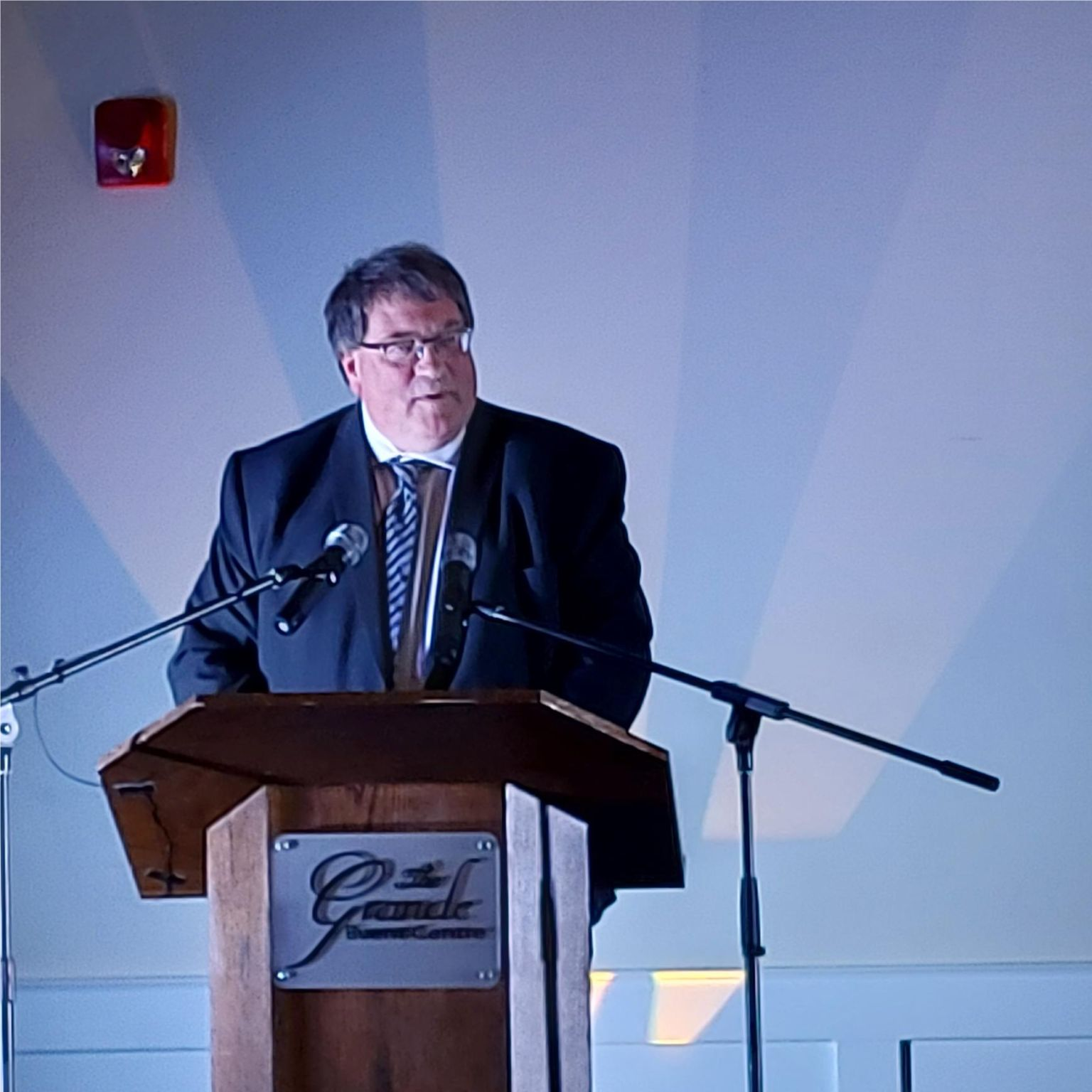
- Coates speaking in 2022
- Born: 1956 (age 69–70); Alberta, Canada

Academic background
- Education: University of British Columbia

Academic work
- Discipline: History
- Institutions: University of Saskatchewan (Canada Research Chair and faculty member in the Johnson Shoyama Graduate School of Public Policy)

Ken Coates (born 1956) is a Canadian historian focused on the history of the Canadian North and Aboriginal rights and indigenous claims. His other areas of specialization include Arctic sovereignty; science, technology and society, with an emphasis on Japan; world and comparative history; and post-secondary education. Coates is a professor and Canada Research Chair in Regional Innovation, Johnson Shoyama Graduate School of Public Policy, and Director, International Centre for Northern Governance and Development at the University of Saskatchewan. In 2015, Coates was elected as a Fellow of the Royal Society of Canada.

While Coates was dean of arts at the University of Waterloo, he played an integral role in the development of the University of Waterloo Stratford Campus and was a member of the Waterloo Stratford Campus Advisory Board.

== Early life and education ==
Coates received his B.A. and Ph.D. from the University of British Columbia, and his M.A. from the University of Manitoba. He was a sessional lecturer in the Department of History at Langara College from 1980 to 1982 and at the University of British Columbia from 1982 to 1983. He then joined Brandon University as an associate professor from 1983 to 1986 before joining the History Department at the University of Victoria from 1986 to 1992. In 1991, Coates was appointed the first vice-president academic at the University of Northern British Columbia, where he stayed until 1995. Coates taught at the University of Waikato in New Zealand from 1995 to 1997. He has held the position of Dean of Arts at the University of New Brunswick from 1997 to 2000, the University of Saskatchewan from 2001 to 2004, and the University of Waterloo from 2006 to 2012.

== Challenging university myths ==
In the 2011 publication entitled Campus Confidential, Coates along with his co-author Bill Morrison argue that there is no evidence for the claim that "a highly educated workforce is crucial to national success," and therefore question why "[c]ountries are racing to educate their youth." They challenge the necessity of "continued exponential growth in undergraduate education," meaning that an increasing proportion of first-year students are not really capable of university-level studies, and that many graduates in some fields of study must consider jobs for which they are overqualified.

== The Centre for International Governance Innovation (CIGI) ==
Coates, in a 2013 series co-authored with Terry Mitchell, entitled The Rise of the Fourth World, argued that the United Nations Declaration on the Rights of Indigenous Peoples, adopted by the United Nations General Assembly in 2007 and endorsed by Canada in 2010, resonates powerfully with Indigenous peoples, while national governments have not yet fully understood its impact. UNDRIP which codifies "Indigenous historical grievances, contemporary challenges and socio-economic, political and cultural aspirations" is a "culmination of generations-long efforts by Indigenous organizations to get international attention, to secure recognition for their aspirations, and to generate support for their political agendas."

== Call for support in standing with the Jewish people in Canada ==
In a 2009 op-ed published in the National Post, Coates expressed concern for the rising tide of anti-Semitism and called for other Canadians to respect Jews as Canadians and to recognize their contributions to Canada. He argued, "Standing with the Jewish people of Canada does not assume unquestioning support for Israel or the actions of the current government." He warned that as Canadians, they "must make it clear, before hostile words turn into aggressive actions, that the Jews will never again stand alone."

== Select bibliography ==
- Canada's Colonies: A History of the Yukon and the Northwest Territories (1985)
- Best Left As Indians: Native-White Relations in the Yukon Territory (1991)
- Land of the Midnight Sun: A History of the Yukon (1998), coauthored with William R. Morrison
- The Marshall Decision and Native Rights (2000)
- A Global History of Indigenous Peoples: Struggle and Survival (2004)

== See also ==
- List of University of Waterloo people
