= Michael Trebilcock =

New Zealand-born Canadian-based law academic

Michael John Trebilcock (Note: LL.B. (Canterbury, New Zealand), 1961, LL.M. (Adelaide) 1962, called to the Bar of New Zealand in 1964 and the Bar of Ontario in 1975.) (born 1941) is a New Zealand-born, Canadian-based law academic. He is currently distinguished university professor and professor of law at the University of Toronto, specializing in law and economics.

== Early life ==
Trebilcock attended Rangiora High School.

== Teacher ==
Trebilcock taught at the University of Adelaide, South Australia, until 1969, when he came to Canada as a visiting associate professor of law at McGill Law School. He was appointed associate professor of law at McGill in 1970 and joined the faculty of law at the University of Toronto as a professor of law in 1972. He has served as national vice-president of the Consumers' Association of Canada, chair of the Consumer Research Council and research director of the Professional Organizations Committee for the Government of Ontario. He was a fellow in law and economics at the University of Chicago Law School in 1976, a visiting professor of law at Yale Law School in 1985, and a global law professor at New York University Law School in 1997 and 1999. From 1982 to 1986 he was a member of the Research Council of the Canadian Institute of Advanced Research. In 1987 he was elected a fellow of the Royal Society of Canada and was appointed a university professor in 1990. He was honoured with a University of Toronto Teaching Award in 1986.

== Author ==
He was awarded the Warren Owen Prize in 1989 by the Foundation for Legal Research for his book, The Common Law of Restraint of Trade, which was chosen as the best law book in English published in Canada in the past two years. He has since authored The Limits of Freedom of Contract and co-authored The Regulation of International Trade; Exploring the Domain of Accident Law: Taking the Facts Seriously; and The Making of the Mosaic: A History of Canadian Immigration Policy.

== Awards ==
Trebilcock specializes in law and economics, international trade and contract and commercial law. He serves as co-director of the Law and Economics Program. In 1999, Trebilcock received an honorary doctorate in laws from McGill University and was awarded the Canada Council Molson Prize in the Humanities and Social Sciences. In the same year he was elected an honorary foreign fellow of the American Academy of Arts and Sciences.

== Select publications ==
- 'Economic Criteria of Unconscionability' in Reiter and Swan (eds), Studies in Contract Law 390
- 'The Law and Economics of Contract Modifications' (with Aivazian and Penny) (1984) 22 Osgoode Hall Law Journal 173
- Michael Trebilcock and Ron Daniels, Rule of Law Reform and Development: Charting the Fragile Path of Progress (Edward Elgar, June 2008).
