= Finance and Central Services Department =

From 1999 until 2007, the Finance and Central Services Department (SEFCSD) was a civil service department of the Scottish Executive. SEFCSD was responsible for the financial administration of the executive, including the annual budget and the issue of payments (for example local government grants) and recording of receipts. In addition, the department was also responsible for the executive's work in international development. In September 2007, all departments within the Scottish Executive were abolished. Business is now dealt with by directorates. There was a short-lived position of director-general economy. The Scottish government's chief economic adviser is Gary Gillespie.

== Structure ==
The department was structured into three groups:

- Finance Group- responsible for budgeting and accounting, including the administration of the Scottish Executive Accounting System which was used throughout the Executive.
- International & Communication Group- responsible for the Executive's aims of making Scotland "a leading small nation to visit, live, work, study, do business with and invest in". It also provided communication and marketing for the Executive.
- Public Sector Reform Group- promotion of excellence in the delivery of public services including best value and the efficient government initiative.
