= Stacey International =

Publisher based in London, United Kingdom

Stacey International was an independent publisher based at 128 Kensington Church Street, in London. Founded in 1974 by Tom Stacey, and specialising in the Middle East, the company aimed to "maintain a resolute tradition of adaptive and imaginative publishing". The 1930s books were updated in 2010 by editor David Evans, a historian and former head of history at Eton College.
