= Ross McKitrick =

Canadian economist

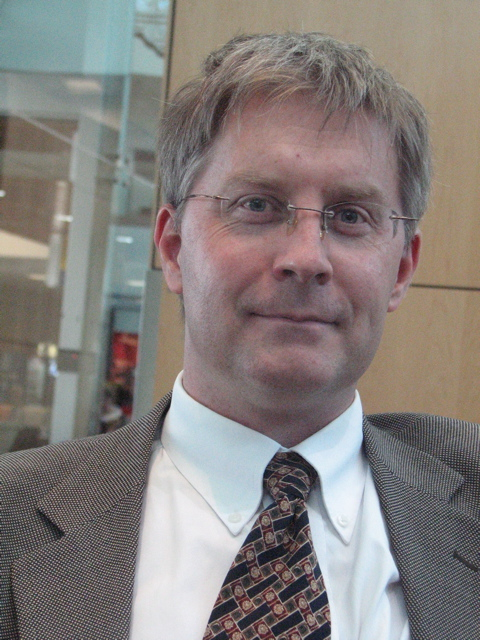
- Born: 1965 (age 60–61)
- Education: BA (Hons) (1988) economics, MA (1990) economics, PhD (1996) economics
- Alma mater: Queen's University; University of British Columbia
- Occupation: Economist
- Employer: University of Guelph
- Organization(s): Senior Fellow, Fraser Institute, Vancouver, B.C. Member of the academic advisory board of the Global Warming Policy Foundation
- Notable work: Taken by Storm
- Website: https://www.rossmckitrick.com/

Ross McKitrick (born 1965) is a Canadian economist specializing in environmental economics and policy analysis. He is a professor of economics at the University of Guelph, and a senior fellow of the Fraser Institute.

McKitrick has authored works about environmental economics and ones denying the scientific consensus on climate change, including co-authoring the book Taken by Storm: The Troubled Science, Policy and Politics of Global Warming, published in 2002. He is the author of Economic Analysis of Environmental Policy, published by the University of Toronto Press.

== Biography ==
McKitrick gained his doctorate in economics in 1996 from the University of British Columbia, and in the same year was appointed assistant professor in the Department of Economics at the University of Guelph, Ontario. In 2001 he received an associate professorship and has been a full professor since December 2008. He has also been a senior fellow of the Fraser Institute since 2002. He is a member of the academic advisory board of the Global Warming Policy Foundation.

== Writing ==
McKitrick has authored works about environmental economics and ones denying the scientific consensus on climate change. With Christopher Essex he co-authored the 2002 Taken by Storm: The Troubled Science, Policy and Politics of Global Warming, a book that was a runner-up for the Donner Prize. McKitrick was involved in disputing hockey stick graph temperature reconstructions.

In 2025, with John Christy, Judith Curry, Steven E. Koonin, and Roy Spencer, McKitrick was a member of the United States Department of Energy's Climate Working Group and a co-author of its A Critical Review of Impacts of Greenhouse Gas Emissions on the U.S. Climate (23 July 2025)
