= Muir Russell =

Scottish civil servant (born 1949)

Sir Muir Russell KCB DL FRSE
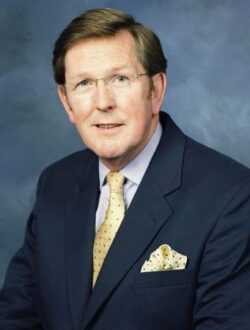

Principal and Vice-Chancellor of the University of Glasgow
- In office 1 October 2003 – 1 October 2009
- Preceded by: Professor Sir Graeme Davies
- Succeeded by: Professor Anton Muscatelli

Permanent Secretary to the Scottish Executive
- In office May 1998 – July 2003
- First Minister: Donald Dewar; Jim Wallace (acting); Henry McLeish; Jim Wallace (acting); Jack McConnell
- Preceded by: Sir Russell Hillhouse
- Succeeded by: Sir John Elvidge

Chair of the Judicial Appointments Board for Scotland
- In office 2008–2010
- First Minister: Alex Salmond
- Preceded by: Neil McIntosh
- Succeeded by: Dr Michael Ewart

Personal details
- Born: Alastair Muir Russell; 9 January 1949 (age 77) Glasgow, Scotland
- Spouse: Eileen Mackay
- Education: University of Glasgow
- Profession: Civil servant

Sir Alastair Muir Russell KCB DL FRSE (born 9 January 1949) is a Scottish retired civil servant and former Principal and Vice-Chancellor of the University of Glasgow, and Chairman of the Judicial Appointments Board for Scotland.

== Early life ==
Russell was born on 9 January 1949 in Glasgow and educated at the High School of Glasgow, which was then the city's grammar school, and at the University of Glasgow, where he took a First in Natural Philosophy.

== Career ==
=== Civil Service ===
He joined the Scottish Office in 1970 and became Secretary of the Scottish Development Agency on its establishment in Glasgow in 1975. He was Principal Private Secretary to the Secretary of State for Scotland from 1981 to 1983 and was seconded to the Cabinet Office in 1990. He was appointed Permanent Secretary at The Scottish Office in May 1998, and to the Scottish Executive since its establishment in 1999.

=== University of Glasgow ===
He took office as Principal of the University of Glasgow on 1 October 2003, but attracted much criticism for his handling of the 2006 lecturers' strike, as well as attempts to close the University's Crichton Campus in Dumfries and for receiving pay rises which were much greater than the rate of inflation. He retired in October 2009, and was succeeded by Professor Anton Muscatelli, former Vice-Principal of the University and former Principal of Heriot-Watt University, Edinburgh. On 7 October 2008, Scottish Justice Secretary Kenny MacAskill announced Sir Muir would succeed Sir Neil McIntosh as Chairman of the Judicial Appointments Board for Scotland for a three year appointment. His was re-appointed for another three years from 2011–2014.

=== Climatic Research Unit investigation ===
In December 2009 he was appointed to head an independent investigation into allegations concerning the Climatic Research Unit email controversy. The inquiry reported on 7 July 2010, largely clearing the UEA of the allegations. The "rigour and honesty" of the scientists at the Climatic Research Unit were found not to be in doubt. However, the panel also concluded the scientists were insufficiently open about their work and unhelpful and defensive in response to freedom of information requests. Notable scholars and experts, including John Beddington and Myles Allen, welcomed the findings of the inquiry and stated that the climate scientists had been cleared of the allegations of misconduct, while Patrick Michaels disagreed.

== Personal life ==
Russell is married to Eileen Mackay, also a former Scottish Office civil servant who left the civil service and became, amongst other interests, a director of the Royal Bank of Scotland. He was elected a fellow of the Royal Society of Edinburgh in 2000 and holds honorary degrees from the University of Glasgow, University of Edinburgh and the University of Strathclyde. He was appointed a Knight Commander of the Order of the Bath (KCB) in the 2001 Birthday Honours.

Government offices
Preceded by Sir Russell Hillhouse	Permanent Secretary of the Scottish Office; 1998–1999	Office abolished
New office	Permanent Secretary to the Scottish Executive; 1999–2003	Succeeded by Sir John Elvidge
Academic offices
Preceded by Professor Sir Graeme Davies	Principal and Vice-Chancellor of the University of Glasgow; 2003 – October 2009	Succeeded by Professor Anton Muscatelli
