= Dansgaard–Oeschger event =

Rapid climate fluctuation in the last glacial period

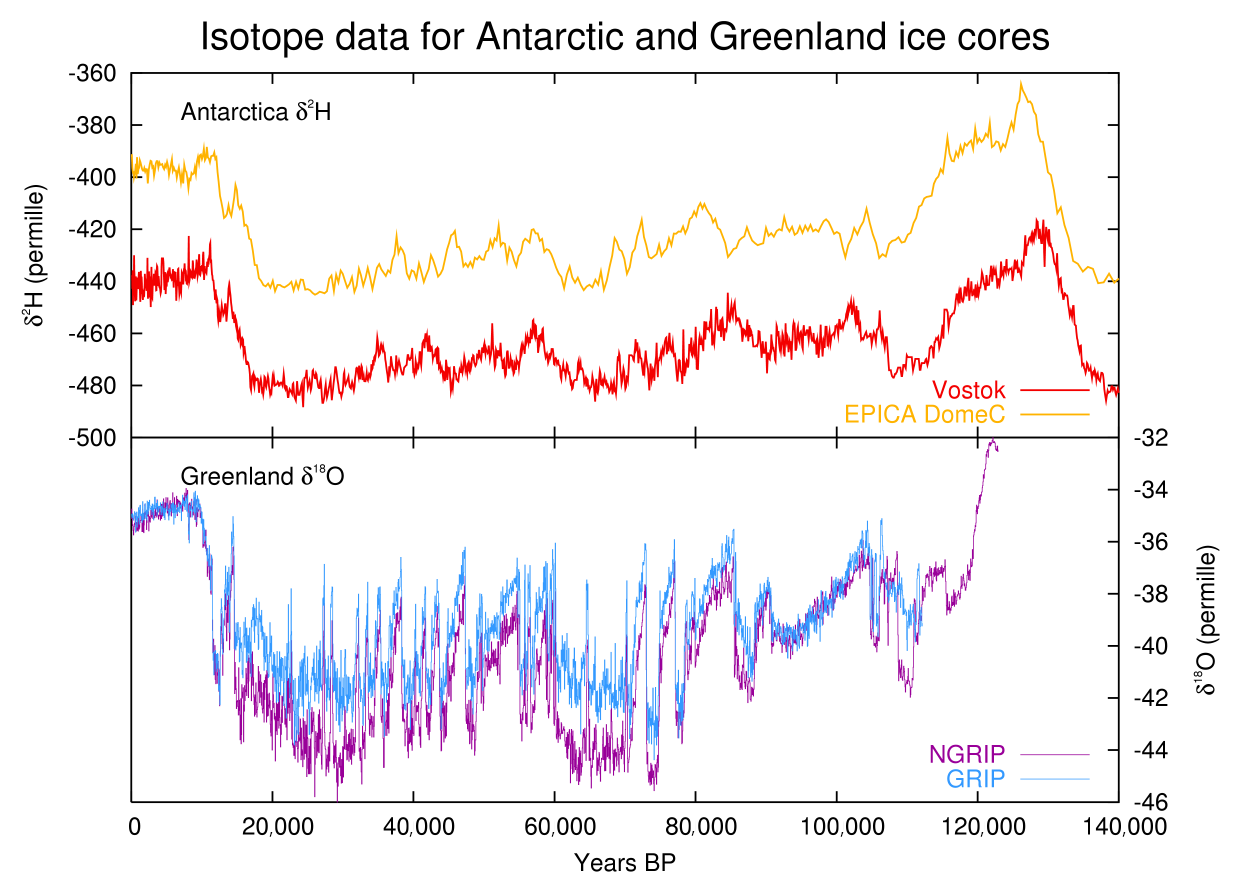
Temperature proxy from four ice cores for the last 140,000 years, clearly indicating the greater magnitude of the D-O effect in the northern hemisphere

A Dansgaard–Oeschger event (often abbreviated D–O event) is a rapid climate fluctuation; such events occurred 25 times during the last glacial period. Some scientists say that the events occur quasi-periodically with a recurrence time being a multiple of 1,470 years, but this is debated. The comparable climate cyclicity during the Holocene is referred to as Bond events. Dansgaard–Oeschger refers to palaeoclimatologists Willi Dansgaard and Hans Oeschger.

== Evidence ==
The best evidence for Dansgaard–Oeschger events remains in the Greenland ice cores, which only go back to the end of the last interglacial, the Eemian interglacial (about 115,000 years ago). Ice core evidence from Antarctic cores suggests that the Dansgaard–Oeschger events are related to the so-called Antarctic Isotope Maxima by means of a coupling of the climate of the two hemispheres, the polar see-saw. If this relationship holds also for the previous glacials, Antarctic data suggest that D-O events were present in previous glacial periods as well. Unfortunately, current ice core records from Greenland extend only through the last most recent glacial period so direct evidence of D-O events in earlier glacial periods from Greenland ice is unavailable. However, work by Stephen Barker and colleagues has shown that the existing Greenland record can be reconstructed by deriving the Antarctic ice core record. This allows for the reconstruction of an older Greenland record through the derivation of the nearly million-year-long Antarctic ice core record.

== Effect ==
In the Northern Hemisphere, they take the form of rapid warming episodes, typically in a matter of decades, each followed by gradual cooling over a longer period. For example, about 11,500 years ago, averaged annual temperatures on the Greenland ice sheet increased by around 8 °C over 40 years, in three steps of five years, where a 5 °C change over 30–40 years is more common. Warming resulting from D-O events extended farther south into central North America as well, as indicated by speleothem oxygen isotope excursions chronologically corresponding to D-O events recorded in Greenland ice cores. The impact of D-O events in Europe is also recorded by fluctuations in discharge and sedimentation patterns in fluvial systems like the Tisza River.

Heinrich events only occur in the cold spells immediately preceding D-O warmings, leading some to suggest that D-O cycles may cause the events, or at least constrain their timing.

The course of a D-O event sees a rapid warming, followed by a cool period lasting a few hundred years. This cold period sees an expansion of the polar front, with ice floating further south across the North Atlantic Ocean.

D-O events are also believed to cause minor increases in atmospheric carbon dioxide concentrations on the order of around 5 ppm.

During D-O events, positive δ^{18}O excursions occur in Floresian speleothem records, indicating a weakening of the Indonesian-Australian Monsoon during such events.

The effects of D-O events have also been observed in the Northern Andes, where D-O events during the Penultimate Glacial Period have been shown to have corresponded to changes in vegetation regimes.

== Causes ==
The processes behind the timing and amplitude of these events (as recorded in ice cores) are still unclear. The pattern in the Southern Hemisphere is different, with slow warming and much smaller temperature fluctuations. Indeed, the Vostok ice core was drilled before the Greenland cores, and the existence of Dansgaard–Oeschger events was not widely recognised until the Greenland (GRIP/GISP2) cores were done, after which there was some reexamination of the Vostok core to see if these events had somehow been "missed".

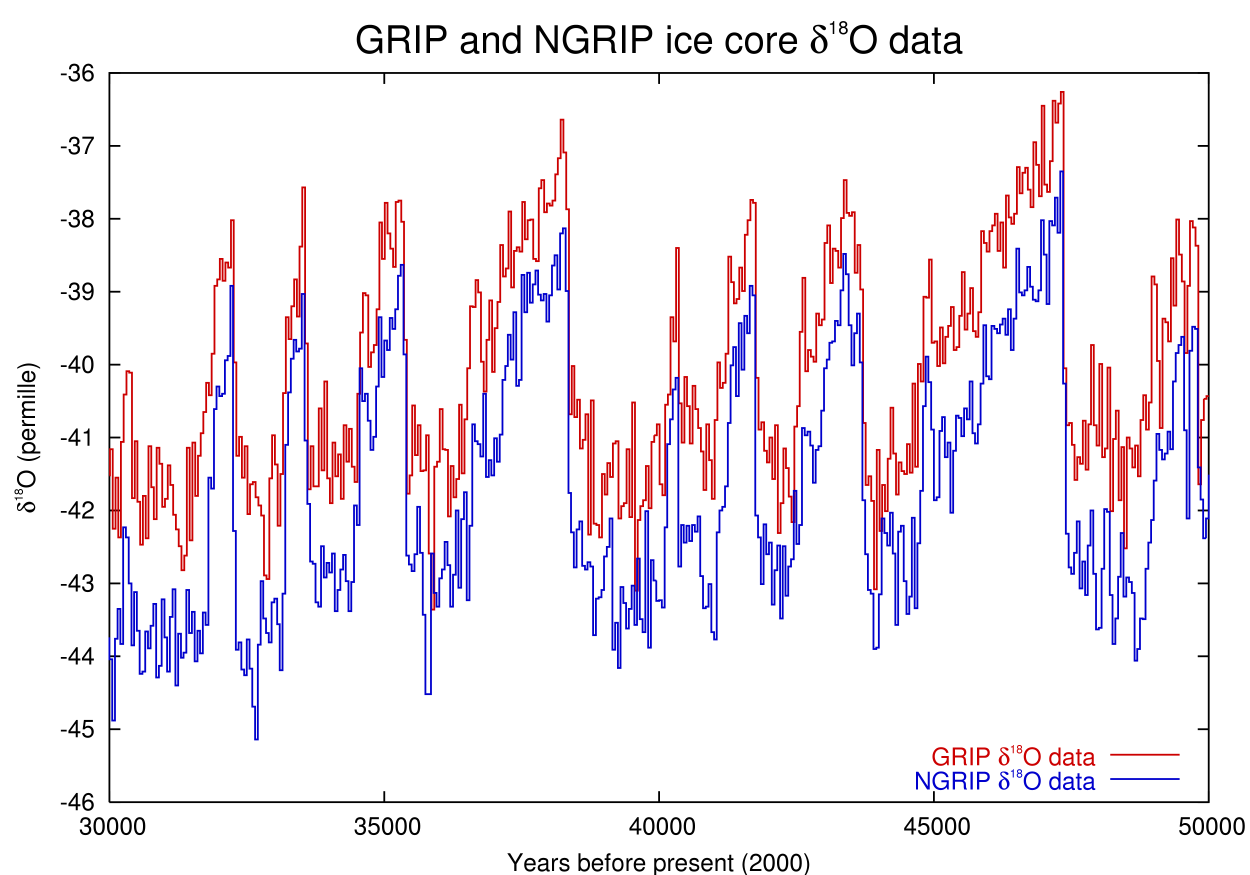
A closeup near 40 kyr BP, showing reproducibility between cores

The events appear to reflect changes in the North Atlantic Ocean circulation, perhaps triggered by an influx of fresh water or rain.

The events may be caused by an amplification of solar forcings, or by a cause internal to the earth system – either a "binge-purge" cycle of ice sheets accumulating so much mass they become unstable, as postulated for Heinrich events, or an oscillation in deep ocean currents (Maslin et al.. 2001, p25).

These events have been attributed to changes in the size of the ice sheets and atmospheric carbon dioxide. The former determines the strength of the Atlantic Ocean circulation via altering the northern hemisphere westerly winds, gulf stream, and sea-ice systems. The latter modulates atmospheric inter-basin freshwater transport across Central America, which changes the freshwater budget in the North Atlantic and thus the circulation. These studies corroborate the previously suggested existence of a "D-O window" of AMOC bistability ('sweet spot' for abrupt climate changes) associated with ice volume and atmospheric CO_{2}, accounting for the occurrences of D-O type events under intermediate glacial conditions in the late Pleistocene.

== Timing ==
Although the effects of the Dansgaard–Oeschger events are largely constrained to ice cores taken from Greenland, there is evidence to suggest that D-O events have been globally synchronous. A spectral analysis of the American GISP2 isotope record showed a peak of [^{18}O:^{16}O] abundance around 1500 years. This was proposed by Schulz (2002) to be a regular periodicity of 1470 years. This finding was supported by Rahmstorf (2003); if only the most recent 50,000 years from the GISP2 core are examined, the variation of the trigger is ±12% (±2% in the 5 most recent events, whose dates are probably most precise).

However, the older parts of the GISP2 core do not show this regularity, nor do the same events in the GRIP core. This may be because the first 50 kyr of the GISP2 core are most accurately dated, by layer counting. The climate system response to the trigger is varying within 8% of the period. Oscillations within the Earth system can be expected to be far more irregular in period. Rahmstorf suggests that the highly regular pattern would point more to an orbital cycle. Such a source has not been identified. The closest orbital cycle, a Lunar cycle of 1,800 years, cannot be reconciled with this pattern. The dating between the European GRIP ice core, and the American GISP2 ice core differs by about 5000 years at 50,000 years BP. It was noted by Ditlevsen et al. (2005) that the spectral peak found in the GISP2 ice core was not present in the GRIP core, and thus depended critically on the accuracy of the dating. The dating issue was largely solved by the accurate dating of the NGRIP core. Using this dating the recurrence of Dansgaard–Oeschger events is random consistent with a noise-induced Poisson process.

D-O cycles may set their own timescale. Maslin et al.. (2001) suggested that each ice sheet had its own conditions of stability, but that on melting, the influx of freshwater was enough to reconfigure ocean currents, causing melting elsewhere. More specifically, D-O cold events, and their associated influx of meltwater, reduce the strength of the North Atlantic Deep Water current (NADW), weakening the northern hemisphere circulation and therefore resulting in an increased transfer of heat polewards in the southern hemisphere. This warmer water results in melting of Antarctic ice, thereby reducing density stratification and the strength of the Antarctic Bottom Water current (AABW). This allows the NADW to return to its previous strength, driving Northern Hemisphere melting – and another D-O cold event.

The theory may also explain Heinrich events' apparent connection to the D-O cycle; when the accumulation of meltwater in the oceans reaches a threshold, it may have raised sea level enough to undercut the Laurentide ice sheet – causing a Heinrich event and resetting the cycle.

The little ice age around 400 to 200 years ago has been interpreted by some as the cold part of a D-O cycle.

== History ==
The ice core's signals now recognised as Dansgaard–Oeschger events are, in retrospect, visible in the original GISP core, as well as the Camp Century Greenland core. But at the time the ice cores were made, their significance was noted but not widely appreciated. Dansgaard et al. (AGU geophysical monograph 33, 1985) note their existence in the GRIP core as "violent oscillations" in the δ^{18}O signal, and that they appear to correlate to events in the previous Camp Century core 1,400 km (870 mi) away, thus providing evidence for their corresponding to widespread climatic anomalies (with only the Camp Century core, they could have been local fluctuations). Dansgaard et al. speculate that these may be related to quasi-stationary modes of the atmosphere-ocean system. D-O events tend to be what drives the "Sahara pump" which has had an effect upon human evolution and dispersal.

The cyclicity is also found during the Holocene, where the events are referred to as Bond events.

== See also ==
- Younger Dryas
