= List of ice cores =

This is a list of ice cores drilled for scientific purposes. Note that many of these locations are on moving ice sheets, and the latitude and longitude given is as of the date of drilling.

== Africa ==
| Core | Institution or project | Coords | Altitude (metres) | Drill dates | Depth (metres) | Sources |
|---|---|---|---|---|---|---|
| Lewis Glacier 1, Kenya | University of East Anglia | 0°9′S 37°18′E | 4880 | 1975 | 6 | |
| Lewis Glacier 1, Kenya | University of East Anglia | 0°10′S 37°19′E | 4880 | 1977 | 11 | |
| Lewis Glacier 1, Kenya | IPS | 0°10′S 37°19′E | c. 4980 | 1978 | 13 | |
| Lewis Glacier 2, Kenya | IPS | 0°10′S 37°19′E | c. 4980 | 1978 | 12 | |
| NIF1 (Northern Ice Field, Kilimandjaro, Tanzania) | Ohio State University | 3°04′S 37°21′E | c. 5893 | 2000 | 50.9 | |
| NIF2 (Northern Ice Field, Kilimandjaro, Tanzania) | Ohio State University | 3°04′S 37°21′E | c. 5893 | 2000 | 50.8 | |
| NIF3 (Northern Ice Field, Kilimandjaro, Tanzania) | Ohio State University | 3°04′S 37°21′E | c. 5893 | 2000 | 49.0 | |
| FWG (Furtwängler Glacier, Kilimandjaro, Tanzania) | Ohio State University | 3°04′S 37°21′E | c. 5893 | 2000 | 9.5 | |
| SIF1 (Southern Ice Field, Kilimandjaro, Tanzania) | Ohio State University | 3°04′S 37°21′E | c. 5893 | 2000 | 18.5 | |
| SIF2 (Southern Ice Field, Kilimandjaro, Tanzania) | Ohio State University | 3°04′S 37°21′E | c. 5893 | 2000 | 22.3 | |

== Antarctica ==
| Core | Institution or project | Coords | Altitude (metres) | Drill dates | Depth (metres) | Sources |
|---|---|---|---|---|---|---|
| Maudheim | NBSAE | 71°3′S 10°56′E | 38 | 1950-1951 | 100 | |
| Mirny | SAE | 66°33′S 93°1′E | | 1957 | 67 | (Note: Not included in MacKinnon's 1980 catalogue. Ueda & Talalay make it clear that a coring drill was used for this hole but not whether a core was retrieved.) |
| Mirny | SAE | | c. 200 | 1957 | 371 | (Note: The core site was 7 km south of Mirny (66°33′S 93°1′E).) |
| Wilkes S-2 | IPS/AINA | 66°31′S 112°13′E | 1139 | 1957 | 61 | |
| Mirny | SAE | | | 1958 | 100 | (Note: The core site was 45 km south of Mirny (66°33′S 93°1′E).) |
| Byrd | SIPRE | 80°01′S 119°31′W | 1543 | 1958 | 308 | |
| Byrd | SIPRE | 80°0′S 120°0′W | 1524 | 1958 | 49 | |
| Little America V | SIPRE | 78°2′S 162°45′W | 43 | 1958 | 264 | |
| Little America V | SIPRE | 78°11′S 162°10′W | 42 | 1958 | 18 | |
| Byrd and Marie Byrd Traverse | IPS | various | various | 1958-1959 | c. 10 | (Note: Ten cores.) |
| Byrd and Marie Byrd Traverse | IPS | various | various | 1958-1959 | 20 | (Note: Three cores.) |
| Pit 4 | AINA/University of Michigan | c. 78°34′S 163°57′W | 20 | 1959 | 22 | |
| Pit 5 | AINA/University of Michigan | c. 78°34′S 163°57′W | 25 | 1959 | 19 | |
| Mirny | SAE | 66°33′S 93°1′E | | 1960-1961 | | |
| Base Roi Baudoin | EAB | 70°26′S 24°19′E | 39 | 1961 | 116 | |
| Ski-Hi (Eights) | IPS | 75°15′S 77°7′W | 452 | 1961 | 21 | |
| Eight Station | IPS | 75°15′S 77°7′W | 452 | 1961-1962 | 22 | |
| C-Site | IPS | 75°0′S 73°0′W | | 1961-1962 | 8 | |
| M796 | IPS | 74°27′S 67°8′W | 2150 | 1962 | 25 | |
| Whitmore Mountains Traverse | IPS | various | various | 1962-1963 | 10 | (Note: Nine cores.) |
| P64A | EAB | 71°58′S 24°19′E | 1500 | 1964 | 10 | |
| P64B | EAB | 71°58′S 24°19′E | 1500 | 1964 | 10 | |
| M185 | EAB | 86°45′S 58°36′E | 3110 | 1964 | 11 | |
| M275 | EAB | 86°38′S 30°36′E | 2860 | 1964 | 12 | |
| M370 | EAB | 85°46′S 8°42′E | 2690 | 1964 | 11 | |
| Pionerskaya | EPF | 69°44′S 95°31′E | 2740 | 1964 | 10 | |
| Pionerskaya | EPF | 69°44′S 95°31′E | 2740 | 1964 | 7 | |
| G1 | EPF | 66°41′S 139°55′E | 86 | 1964-1966 | 98 | |
| A3 | EPF | 66°43′S 139°54′E | 220 | 1964-1966 | 106 | |
| G2 | EPF | 66°42′S 139°55′E | 112 | 1964-1966 | 106 | |
| M415 | EAB | 85°10′S 1°36′E | 2630 | 1965 | 12 | |
| M496 | EAB | 84°58′S 17°54′E | 2680 | 1965 | 10 | |
| M620 | EAB | 84°10′S 37°36′E | 3170 | 1965 | 10 | |
| Mirny | SAE | 66°33′S 93°1′E | | 1965-1966 | | (Note: Not included in MacKinnon's 1980 catalogue. Three holes were drilled to a total combined depth of 101 m; the deepest was 77 m.) |
| M363 | EAB | 82°0′S 9°35′E | 2510 | 1966 | 10 | |
| M455 | EAB | 81°30′S 20°30′E | 2870 | 1966 | 10 | |
| Plateau | IPS | 79°15′S 40°30′E | 3624 | 1966-1967 | 71 | |
| Byrd | CRREL | 80°0′S 120°0′W | 1524 | 1966-1967 | 35 | |
| Byrd | CRREL | 80°0′S 120°0′W | 1524 | 1966-1967 | 35 | |
| Byrd | CRREL | 80°01′S 119°31′W | 1543 | 1966–1968 | 2164 | |
| M248 | EAB | 78°19′S 23°22′E | 3360 | 1967 | 10 | |
| Byrd | CRREL | 80°0′S 120°0′W | 1524 | 1967-1968 | 57 | (Note: Four cores.) |
| Byrd | CRREL | 80°0′S 120°0′W | 1524 | 1967-1968 | 335 | |
| M500 | EAB | 76°22′S 9°32′E | 3230 | 1968 | 10 | |
| M750 | EAB | 77°53′S 1°55′W | 2540 | 1968 | 9 | |
| Amery Ice Shelf G1 | ANARE | c. 69°0′S 71°0′E | c. 50 | 1968 | 310 | |
| Syowa to South Pole traverse | JARE | various | c. 40 to 2912 | 1968-1969 | 10 | (Note: A 10 m core was drilled every 100 km between 69°0′S 39°35′E and 90°00′S.) |
| Byrd Station | University of Bern | 80°01′S 119°31′W | 1543 | 1969 | 400 | |
| Cape Folger SGA | ANARE | c. 66°8′S 110°55′E | 375 | 1969 | 324 | |
| Law Dome SGD | ANARE | c. 66°39′S 112°50′E | 1390 | 1969 | 385 | |
| Mirny | SAE | 67°0′S 93°30′E | c. 1000 | 1969 | 250 | (Note: Ueda and Talalay (2007) mention two test holes of 35 m each, but do not say whether cores were retrieved, though the drill was able to recover cores.) |
| Penta 3 | SAE/EPF | 74°1′S 97°22′E | c. 3400 | 1969 | 7 | |
| Penta 4 | SAE/EPF | c. 74°30′S 97°19′E | c. 3125 | 1969 | 11 | |
| Penta 5 | SAE/EPF | 74°1′S 97°22′E | c. 3300 | 1969 | 15 | |
| Byrd | CRREL | 80°0′S 120°0′W | 1524 | 1969-1970 | 50 | |
| Byrd | CRREL | 80°0′S 120°0′W | 1524 | 1969-1970 | 82 | |
| Byrd | CRREL | 80°0′S 120°0′W | 1524 | 1969-1970 | 354 | |
| Vostok 1, 1-bis, and 1-2bis | SAE | 78°28′S 106°48′E | 3488 | 1969-1973 | 952 | (Note: Hole 1 was drilled to 952 m between 1969 and 1972. An offset hole, 1-bis, was started at 30 m down hole 1 in 1972, and reached 780 m the following year. Another offset hole, 1-2bis, was begun at 307 m in hole 1-bis, and reached 905 m.) |
| Mizuho | JARE | 70°42′S 44°18′E | 2230 | 1970 | 20 | |
| Mizuho | JARE | 70°42′S 44°18′E | 2230 | 1971 | 42 | |
| Mizuho | JARE | 70°42′S 44°18′E | 2230 | 1971 | 75 | |
| D100 | CNRS | 71°34′S 131°59′E | 2810 | 1971-1972 | c. 12 | |
| D120 | CNRS | 73°4′S 128°44′E | 3010 | 1971-1972 | c. 12 | |
| 57 km | SAE | c. 67°0′S 93°30′E | c. 1000 | 1971-1972 | 51 | (Note: Drilled along the traverse from Mirny to Vostok.) |
| 153 km | SAE | c. 68°0′S 94°0′E | c. 1600 | 1971-1972 | 57 | |
| Vostok 2 and 2-bis | SAE | 78°28′S 106°48′E | 3488 | 1971-1976 | 450 | (Note: The hole was drilled in 1971 to 108 m, and then extended to 224 m in between 1974 and 1976. An offset hole, 2-bis, was begun in 1976, but the drill got stuck after only a few runs; the additional depth drilled was not recorded and Vasiliev does not report whether any cores were recovered.) |
| Cape Poinsett SGJ | ANARE | c. 65°50′S 113°13′E | 400 | 1972 | 112 | |
| Casey B SGB | ANARE | c. 66°17′S 111°30′E | 575 | 1972 | 73 | |
| Casey SGP | ANARE | c. 66°13′S 111°15′E | 600 | 1972 | 113 | |
| Casey S1 | ANARE | c. 66°17′S 110°44′E | 262 | 1972 | 53 | |
| D10 | CNRS | 66°42′S 139°55′E | 270 | 1972 | 44 | |
| Mizuho | JARE | 70°42′S 44°18′E | 2230 | 1972 | 148 | |
| Dumont d'Urville to Vostok | EPF/SAE | various | coast to 3500 | 1972-1973 | 17 | (Note: Three cores drilled along the traverse.) |
| Dumont d'Urville to Vostok | EPF/SAE | various | coast to 3500 | 1972-1973 | 25 | (Note: Five cores drilled along the traverse.) |
| Ross Ice Shelf | RISP/University of Copenhagen | various | c. 60 | 1973-1974 | 10 | (Note: Thirty-seven cores.) |
| Lambert Glacier GL1 | ANARE | 72°31′S 65°19′E | 1148 | 1974 | 10 | |
| Enderby Land GL2 | ANARE | 72°16′S 63°58′E | 1607 | 1974 | 10 | |
| Enderby Land GL3 | ANARE | 72°48′S 62°9′E | 1808 | 1974 | 10 | |
| Enderby Land GL4 | ANARE | 73°15′S 61°0′E | 2020 | 1974 | 10 | |
| Enderby Land GL5 | ANARE | 73°43′S 61°11′E | 2000 | 1974 | 10 | |
| Enderby Land GL6 | ANARE | 74°3′S 62°0′E | 1889 | 1974 | 10 | |
| Enderby Land GL7 | ANARE | 74°14′S 64°13′E | 1556 | 1974 | 10 | |
| Enderby Land GL8 | ANARE | 74°59′S 66°6′E | 1763 | 1974 | 10 | |
| Enderby Land GL9 | ANARE | 74°45′S 67°58′E | 1710 | 1974 | 10 | |
| Enderby Land GL10 | ANARE | 74°4′S 68°23′E | 1109 | 1974 | 10 | |
| Enderby Land GL11 | ANARE | 73°44′S 70°37′E | 1462 | 1974 | 10 | |
| Law Dome SGF | ANARE | 66°9′S 111°0′E | 375 | 1974 | 348 | |
| South Pole | PICO | 90°00′S | 2912 | 1974 | 101 | |
| J-9 | RISP/PICO | 82°22′S 168°40′W | 60 | 1974 | 100 | |
| Adelie Land D 10 | CNRS | 66°42′S 139°55′E | 270 | 1974 | 304 | |
| Mizuho | JARE | 70°42′S 44°18′E | 2230 | 1974 | 10 | |
| Byrd Flow Line | IPS | various | various | 1974 | 10 | (Note: About sixteen cores.) |
| South Pole | CNRS | 90°00′S | 2912 | 1974-1975 | 17 | |
| Mizuho | JARE | 70°42′S 44°18′E | 2230 | 1974-1975 | 145 | (Note: The drill stuck at 142 m, and the hole was re-entered at 107 m in an attempt to detach the stuck drill, eventually reaching 145 m on this attempt.) |
| Detroit Plateau | BAE | 64°5′S 59°35′W | 1806 | 1974-1976 | 10 | |
| Bruce Plateau | BAE | 66°25′S 64°57′W | 1937 | 1974-1976 | 10 | |
| Peninsula Plateau Crest | BAE | 67°32′S 66°0′W | 1750 | 1974-1976 | 10 | |
| Adelaide Island | BAE | 67°46′S 68°55′W | 377 | 1974-1976 | 10 | |
| Stowington Island | BAE | 68°11′S 67°0′W | 380 | 1974-1976 | 10 | |
| Gipps Ice Rise | BAE | 68°46′S 60°56′W | 290 | 1974-1976 | 10 | |
| Fleming Glacier | BAE | 69°30′S 66°16′W | 870 | 1974-1976 | 10 | |
| Peninsula Plateau Crest | BAE | 70°1′S 64°29′W | 2131 | 1974-1976 | 10 | |
| Dolleman Island | BAE | 70°37′S 60°44′W | 396 | 1974-1976 | 10 | |
| Murrish Glacier | BAE | 71°7′S 62°20′W | 1050 | 1974-1976 | 10 | |
| Peninsula Plateau | BAE | 71°14′S 63°22′W | 1987 | 1974-1976 | 10 | |
| Peninsula Plateau Crest | BAE | 70°50′S 64°27′W | 2010 | 1974-1976 | 10 | |
| Peninsula Plateau Crest | BAE | 71°15′S 64°30′W | 2010 | 1974-1976 | 10 | |
| Snow Field | BAE | 71°18′S 67°29′W | 290 | 1974-1976 | 10 | |
| Elliot Hills | BAE | 71°23′S 65°30′W | 1547 | 1974-1976 | 10 | |
| Thomson Rock | BAE | 71°29′S 66°58′W | 946 | 1974-1976 | 10 | |
| Charcot Island | BAE | 70°0′S 75°20′W | 595 | 1974-1976 | 10 | |
| Peninsula Plateau Crest | BAE | 71°42′S 64°5′W | 1886 | 1974-1976 | 10 | |
| Monteverde Peninsula | BAE | 72°30′S 72°50′W | 488 | 1974-1976 | 10 | |
| Peninsula Plateau Crest | BAE | 72°47′S 64°30′W | 1797 | 1974-1976 | 10 | |
| Spoatz Island | BAE | 72°50′S 64°30′W | 539 | 1974-1976 | 10 | |
| Peninsula Plateau Crest | BAE | 73°42′S 64°47′W | 2007 | 1974-1976 | 10 | |
| Butler Island | BAE | 72°12′S 60°20′W | 130 | 1974-1976 | 10 | |
| Peninsula Plateau | BAE | 70°53′S 64°57′W | 1835 | 1974-1976 | 10 | |
| Graham Land | BAE | 67°32′S 66°0′W | | 1974-1976 | 5 | |
| Graham Land | BAE | 67°32′S 66°0′W | | 1974-1976 | 5 | |
| Rossini Point | BAE | 72°30′S 72°50′W | 1600 | 1974-1976 | 10 | |
| Rossini Point | BAE | 72°30′S 72°50′W | 1600 | 1974-1976 | 10 | |
| Horse Point | BAE | 71°18′S 67°29′W | 1100 | 1974-1976 | 10 | |
| Horse Point | BAE | 71°18′S 67°29′W | 1100 | 1974-1976 | 10 | |
| Vostok | SAE | 78°28′S 106°48′E | 3500 | 1975 | 105 | |
| Novolazarev Shelf Glacier | SAE | 70°23′S 12°21′E | c. 500 | 1975 | 374 | (Note: MacKinnon's 1980 catalogue includes a 1974-1975 Novolazarevskaya core at 70°46′S 11°50′E which is not mentioned in other sources, but it does not include this 374 m core, so the two seem to be the same despite the slight differences in coordinates and depth.) |
| Novolazarev Shelf | SAE | 70°13′S 11°53′E | 40 | 1975 | 357 | |
| Novolazarev Shelf | SAE | 70°24′S 11°40′E | 40 | 1975 | 447 | (Note: Bentley & Koci give the depth of this hole as 412 m.) |
| Dome C | SAE/EPF | 74°39′S 124°10′E | 3240 | 1975 | 10 | |
| Dome C | SAE/EPF | 74°39′S 124°10′E | 3240 | 1975 | 12 | |
| Dailey Island | SAE/USARP | 77°53′S 165°6′E | | 1975 | 7 | |
| Koettlitz Glacier | SAE/USARP | 78°17′S 164°0′E | 5 | 1975 | 8 | |
| McMurdo Ice Shelf | SAE/USARP | 78°21′S 166°41′E | c. 50 | 1975 | 7 | |
| McMurdo Ice Shelf | SAE/USARP | | c. 50 | 1975 | 6 | |
| Enderby Land GE2 to GE9 | ANARE | various | various | 1976 | c. 8 | (Note: Eight cores.) |
| Dolleman Island | | 70°35′S 60°56′W | 398 | 1976 | 11 | |
| J-9 Bern | PICO | 82°22′S 168°40′W | 60 | 1976 | 155 | |
| J-9 | PICO | 82°22′S 168°41′W | 60 | 1976 | 330 | |
| C-7-2 | IPS | 78°20′N 179°51′E | c. 60 | 1976 | 21 | |
| C-7-3 | IPS | 78°20′S 179°51′E | c. 60 | 1976 | 50 | |
| C-7 | IPS | 78°30′S 177°0′W | c. 60 | 1976 | 50 | |
| Roosevelt Island Dome | IPS | 79°22′S 161°40′W | c. 500 | 1976 | 52 | |
| Camp Norway 3 | NAE 1976–1977 | 72°19′S 16°14′W | c. 510 | 1976-1977 | 10 | |
| Camp Norway 3 | NAE 1976–1977 | 72°19′S 16°14′W | c. 510 | 1976-1977 | 11 | |
| Camp Norway 3 | NAE 1976–1977 | 72°19′S 16°14′W | c. 510 | 1976-1977 | 11 | |
| Camp Norway 3 | NAE 1976–1977 | 72°19′S 16°14′W | c. 510 | 1976-1977 | 13 | |
| Vostok-1 | SAE | 72°8′S 96°35′E | 2940 | 1976-1979 | 750 | (Note: Begun in 1976, this hole reached 721 m during the 1978-1979 drilling season. A new offset hole was accidentally started at 500 m while reaming, and the new hole reached 750 m.) |
| C-16 | PICO | 81°5′S 172°45′E | c. 60 | 1977 | 100 | |
| Q-13 | PICO | 78°57′S 179°55′E | c. 60 | 1977 | 100 | |
| Novolazarevskaya Station | SAE | 70°46′S 11°50′E | 1500 | 1977 | 812 | (Note: MacKinnon's 1980 catalogue gives the altitude as c. 500 m.) |
| James Ross Island | Argentine AE | 64°13′S 57°38′W | 1500 | 1977 | 10 | (Note: MacKinnon (1980) lists two cores in the 1977/1978 season, at c. 64°20′S 57°30′W and c. 1628 m altitude, but Aristarain (1981), the paper that describes these cores, only lists one core, from December 1977, as given here.) |
| Law Dome BHQ | ANARE | c. 66°21′S 111°48′E | 940 | 1977 | 419 | |
| Law Dome BHD | ANARE | 66°44′S 112°50′E | 1390 | 1977 | 473 | |
| Mirnyy-Dome C Traverse | ANARE/SAE | various | various | 1977 | 10 | (Note: Eight cores.) |
| Pionerskaya GM | ANARE/SAE | 69°50′S 95°30′E | | 1977 | 10 | |
| GM10 | ANARE/SAE | 71°38′S 101°50′E | 2977 | 1977 | 10 | |
| GM7 | ANARE/SAE | 70°27′S 97°51′E | 2758 | 1977 | 10 | |
| GM13 | ANARE/SAE | 73°14′S 110°27′E | 2961 | 1977 | 10 | |
| GM23 | ANARE/SAE | 74°39′S 124°10′E | 3240 | 1977 | 10 | |
| Mirnyy | ANARE/SAE | 66°33′S 93°1′E | c. 200 | 1977 | 10 | |
| Vostok | ANARE/SAE | 78°28′S 106°48′E | 3500 | 1977 | 10 | |
| Vostok 1 | ANARE/SAE | 72°8′S 96°35′E | 2940 | 1977 | 10 | |
| Komsomolskaya | ANARE/SAE | 74°1′S 97°22′E | c. 3400 | 1977 | 10 | |
| Mizuho | JARE | 70°42′S 44°18′E | 2230 | 1977 | 46 | |
| J-9 | PICO | 82°22′S 168°40′W | 60 | 1977 | 171 | |
| Dome C (I) | CNRS | 74°39′S 124°10′E | 3240 | 1977-1978 | 905 | (Note: Gillet et al. give a depth of 140 meters for this core, but it appears they are only referring to the depth attained with the first drill used.) |
| Erebus Tongue | DoE Canada/USARP | 77°41′S 167°0′E | | 1977-1978 | 11 | |
| J-9 | SAE/USARP | 82°23′S 168°38′W | 60 | 1978 | 416 | |
| Ross Ice Shelf | | | 30 | 1978 | 416 | |
| South Pole | PICO | 90°00′S | 2912 | 1978 | 111 | |
| Dome C (II) | CNRS | 74°39′S 124°10′E | 3240 | 1978-1979 | 180 | |
| Shackleton Ice Shelf | SAE | c. 65°50′S 96°30′E | 30 | 1978/1979 | 202 | |
| Camp Norway 3 | NAE 1978–1979 | 72°19′S 16°14′W | c. 510 | 1978-1979 | 13 | |
| Mirnyi Station | | | 300 | 1979 | 320 | |
| South Pole | PICO | 90°00′S | 2912 | 1979-1980 | 44 | |
| South Pole | PICO | 90°00′S | 2912 | 1979-1980 | 32 | |
| Vostok | PICO | 78°28′S 106°48′E | 3500 | 1979-1980 | 104 | |
| Vostok | PICO | 78°28′S 106°48′E | 3500 | 1979-1980 | 104 | |
| Vostok | PICO | 78°28′S 106°48′E | 3500 | 1979-1980 | 100 | |
| Vostok | PICO | 78°28′S 106°48′E | 3500 | 1979-1980 | 60 | |
| Vostok | PICO | 78°28′S 106°48′E | 3500 | 1979-1980 | 25 | |
| Adelie Land D57 | | | | 1980-1981 | 203 | |
| South Pole | PICO | 90°00′S | | 1980-1982 | 237 | |
| Vostok 3G, 3G-1, and 3G-2 | SAE | 78°28′S 106°48′E | 3488 | 1980-1985 | 2202 | (Note: Hole 3G was extended by offset holes twice; the extensions, labelled 3G-1 and 3G-2, are treated here as part of a single core. Hole 3G-1 was begun at 1500 m, after 3G reached 1580 m depth; and hole 3G-2 was begun at 1969 m, after 3G-1 had reached 2083 m depth.) |
| Palmer Land/Gomez | | 74°1′S 70°38′W | 1130 | 1981 | 31 | |
| Palmer Land/Gomez | | 74°1′S 70°38′W | 1130 | 1981 | 83 | |
| James Ross Island | | 64°13′S 57°41′W | 1640 | 1981 | 151 | |
| Cape Folger BHC1 | | c. 66°6′S 110°51′E | | 1981-1982 | 301 | (Note: Coordinates estimated from map in Thwaites et al. (1984).) |
| Cape Folger BHC2 | | c. 66°6′S 110°51′E | | 1981-1982 | 344 | |
| Komsomolskaya | | | 3498 | 1983 | 850 | |
| Ronne T340 | | c. 78°40′S 55°30′W | c. 20 | 1983-1984 | 100 | |
| Vostok 4G, 4G-1, and 4G-2 | SAE | 78°28′S 106°48′E | 3488 | 1983-1989 | 2546 | (Note: Hole 4G reached 279 m in 1983. In 1984 an offset hole, 4G-1, was begun at 120 m, and extended to 752 m by 1986. A second offset hole, 4G-2, was begun at 159 m in 4G-1, and reached 2546 m in 1989.) |
| Dominion Range | | | 2780 | 1984 | 201 | |
| Siple | | 75°55′S 84°15′W | 1054 | 1985 | 302 | |
| Dolleman Island | | 70°35′S 60°56′W | 398 | 1986 | 11 | |
| Dolleman Island | | 70°35′S 60°56′W | 398 | 1986 | 32 | |
| Dolleman Island | BAS | 70°35′S 60°56′W | 398 | 1986 | 133 | |
| Law Dome DE08 | AAD | 66°43′S 113°12′E | 1250 | 1987 | 234 | |
| Emery Ice Shelf | | | 20 | 1987-1989 | 252 | |
| Dome B | | | 3600 | 1988 | 780 | |
| Dyer Plateau | | 70°39′S 65°1′W | 1940 | 1988–1989 | 2 x 108 | (Note: Thompson et al. list six cores obtained on the Dyer Plateau but do not give exact locations or altitudes. They give the plateau's coordinates as 70°40′16″S 64°52′30″W, with altitude 2002 m, and then say that in 1988–1989 "two ice cores were drilled to a depth of 108 m at a location 6 km west of the divide. In 1989–90, two cores were recovered 1 m apart on the crest of the Dyer Plateau (core 1 — 233.8 m and core 2 — 235.2 m) and two 50 m cores were drilled 4 km east of the divide". Peel et al. list one core for 1988-1989, at 104 m, which is presumably one of the 108 m cores listed by Thompson et al.) |
| Dyer Plateau | | 70°40′S 64°53′W | 2002 | 1989–1990 | 234 & 235 | |
| Dyer Plateau | | | | 1989–1990 | 2 x 50 | |
| Vostok 5G and 5G-1 | SAE | 78°28′S 106°48′E | 3488 | 1990-2007 | 3661 | (Note: Drilling took place in 1990-1993, 1995-1998, and 2005-2006. Hole 5G reached 2259 m; in 1992 an offset hole, 5G-1, was begun, reaching 3650 m in 2006.) |
| Berkner Island (North Dome) | | 78°18′S 46°17′W | 730 | 1990 | 11 | |
| Berkner Island (South Dome) | | 79°36′S 45°37′W | 940 | 1990 | 11 | |
| Dolleman Island | BAS | 70°35′S 60°56′W | 398 | 1992–1993 | 30 | |
| Law Dome | ANARE | 66°46′S 112°48′E | 1370 | 1988-1993 | 1196 | |
| Taylor Dome | | | | 1993-1994 | 554 | |
| Berkner Island (North Dome) | AWI/BAS | 78°19′S 46°17′W | 718 | 1995 | 151 | |
| Berkner Island (South Dome) | AWI/BAS | 79°34′S 45°47′W | 890 | 1995 | 181 | |
| Dome Fuji | | | | 1995-1996 | 2504 | |
| Siple Dome | | | | 1996-1999 | 1004 | |
| Dome C DC1 | EPICA | | | 1996-1999 | 781 | |
| Dome C DC2 | EPICA | | | 1999-2004 | 3270 | |
| DML B33 | EPICA | 75°10′S 6°30′W | 3160 | 1998 | 131 | |
| DML B32 | EPICA | 75°0′S 0°0′W | 2882 | 1997 | 150 | |
| DML B31 | EPICA | 75°35′S 3°26′W | 2669 | 1997 | 115 | |
| DML CV | EPICA | 76°0′S 8°3′W | 2400 | 1998 | 120 | |
| DML BAS depot | EPICA | 77°2′S 10°30′W | 2176 | 1998 | 122 | |
| DML Kohnen | | | | 2000-2006 | 2774 | |
| DML M150 | EPICA | 75°0′S 15°0′W | 3457 | 2001 | 160 | |
| Berkner Island | BAS | | | 2002-2005 | 948 | |
| Dome Fuji | | | | 2003-2007 | 3035 | |
| Bruce Plateau | IPY LARISSA | 66°2′S 64°4′W | 1976 | 2010 | 143 | |
| Bruce Plateau | IPY LARISSA | 66°2′S 64°4′W | 1976 | 2010 | 448 | |

== Asia ==
=== Mainland and arctic islands ===
| Core | Institution or project | Coords | Altitude (metres) | Drill dates | Depth (metres) | Sources |
|---|---|---|---|---|---|---|
| Shokalsky Glacier | AARI | 76°30′N 62°0′E | c. 1000 | 1957 | 30 | |
| Elbrus, Caucasus | USSR Academy of Science | c. 44°12′N 44°8′E | c. 4000 | 1963 | 200 | |
| Alaty | USSR Academy of Science | c. 50°0′N 87°30′E | c. 4000 | 1965 | 200 | |
| Taisetsu Mountains | ILTS | c. 43°30′N 143°0′E | 1730 | 1966 | 24 | |
| Besengi Glacier | USSR Academy of Science | c. 44°12′N 42°40′E | 2700 | 1966 | 150 | |
| Rongbuk Glacier | IGSNRR | 28°5′N 86°52′E | 5400 | 1966 | 12 | |
| Abramov Glacier | CAHM, USSR | c. 39°0′N 72°0′E | 4400 | 1972 | 110 | |
| Abramov Glacier | | c. 39°0′N 72°0′E | 4400 | 1973 | 50 | |
| Abramov Glacier | | c. 39°0′N 72°0′E | 4400 | 1974 | 106 | |
| Pamir Mountains | CAHM, USSR | c. 39°0′N 72°0′E | c. 3000 | 1974 | 137 | (Note: Zagorodnov et al. list this core along with two of the Abramov Glacier cores as all having the same altitude, 4400 m. MacKinnon gives the lower altitude.) |
| Obruchev Glacier, Polar Urals | AARI | c. 65°0′N 60°0′E | c. 600 | 1974 | 87 | |
| Obruchev Glacier, Polar Urals | AARI | c. 65°0′N 60°0′E | c. 600 | 1974 | 64 | |
| North Pole 19 | AARI | Various | c. 5 | 1974 | 34 | (Note: Drifting ice island.) |
| North Pole 19 | AARI | Various | c. 10 | 1974 | 11 | |
| Vavilov Ice Cap | | | | 1975, 1976 | 150-560 (6 holes) | (Note: Not included in MacKinnon's 1980 catalog.) |
| Vavilov Dome | | c. 80°0′N 96°0′E | c. 780 | 1978 | 450 | |
| Vavilov Dome | | c. 80°0′N 96°0′E | c. 780 | 1978 | 459 | |
| Akademiay Nayk | | | 700 | 1986-1987 | 560, 761 | |
| Elbrus, Caucasus | | | 4100 | 1987 | 72, 72 | |
| Guliya Ice Cap, China | | | 6200 | 1992 | 308 | |
| Windy Dome, Franz Josef Land | | | 500 | 1997 | 36, 315 | |
| Belukha, Altai | Research Institute for Humanity and Nature in Kyoto, Japan | | 4499 | 2003 | 171 | |
| Belukha, Altai (1) | Ice Memory Project (University of Grenoble Alpes Foundation) | | <4506 | 2018 | 160 | |
| Belukha, Altai (2) | Ice Memory Project (University of Grenoble Alpes Foundation) | | <4506 | 2018 | 106 | |
| Elbrus, Caucasus (1) | Ice Memory Project (University of Grenoble Alpes Foundation) | | c. 5100 | 2018 | 150 | |
| Elbrus, Caucasus (2) | Ice Memory Project (University of Grenoble Alpes Foundation) | | c. 5100 | 2018 | 120 | |

=== Southeast Asia ===
| Core | Institution or project | Coords | Altitude (metres) | Drill dates | Depth (metres) | Sources |
|---|---|---|---|---|---|---|
| Meren A | AUENG | c. 4°6′S 137°20′E | 4470 | 1972 | 9 | |
| Meren B | AUENG | c. 4°6′S 137°20′E | 4523 | 1972 | 10 | |
| Meren D | AUENG | c. 4°6′S 137°20′E | 4365 | 1972 | 10 | |
| Meren E | AUENG | c. 4°6′S 137°20′E | 4417 | 1972 | 10 | |
| Meren X | AUENG | c. 4°6′S 137°20′E | 4595 | 1972 | 10 | |
| Carstensz K | AUENG | c. 4°4′S 137°20′E | 4495 | 1973 | c. 10 | |
| Carstensz L | AUENG | c. 4°4′S 137°20′E | 4536 | 1973 | c. 10 | |
| Carstensz M | AUENG | c. 4°4′S 137°20′E | 4595 | 1974 | c. 10 | |

== Europe ==
=== Alps ===
| Core | Institution or project | Coords | Altitude (metres) | Drill dates | Depth (metres) | Sources |
|---|---|---|---|---|---|---|
| Vallée Blanche | CNRS | c. 45°53′N 6°56′E | c. 3550 | 1963 | 55 | |
| Vallée Blanche | CNRS | c. 45°53′N 6°56′E | c. 3550 | 1966 | 36 | |
| L 67 | University of Innsbruck | c. 46°50′N 10°47′E | 3240 | 1967 | 17 | |
| J I | University of Innsbruck | 46°33′N 7°58′E | 3489 | 1967 | 8 | |
| J II | University of Innsbruck | 46°33′N 7°58′E | 3489 | 1967 | 8 | |
| JZ I | University of Innsbruck | 46°33′N 7°58′E | 3471 | 1968 | 7 | |
| JZ II | University of Innsbruck | 46°33′N 7°58′E | 3472 | 1968 | 6 | |
| JZ III | University of Innsbruck | 46°33′N 7°58′E | 3470 | 1968 | 5 | |
| JZ IV | University of Innsbruck | 46°33′N 7°58′E | 3473 | 1968 | 8 | |
| JZ V | University of Innsbruck | 46°33′N 7°58′E | 3480 | 1968 | 10 | |
| JZ VI | University of Innsbruck | 46°33′N 7°58′E | 3487 | 1968 | 9 | |
| JZ VII | University of Innsbruck | 46°33′N 7°58′E | 3471 | 1968 | 5 | |
| Saint Sorlin | CNRS | 45°11′N 6°10′E | 2800 | 1968 | 60 | (Note: MacKinnon's 1980 catalogue lists three 60 m cores in 1968. Gillet et al. do not explicitly list all the cores, but say that one of the 1968 cores was 67 m, and there was a 72 m core in 1969. This list assumes these are two of the cores on MacKinnon's list.) |
| Saint Sorlin | CNRS | 45°11′N 6°10′E | 2800 | 1968 | 67 | |
| Saint Sorlin | CNRS | 45°11′N 6°10′E | 2800 | 1969 | 72 | |
| K I | University of Innsbruck | c. 46°50′N 10°47′E | c. 3350 | 1970 | 13 | |
| K II | University of Innsbruck | c. 46°50′N 10°47′E | c. 3285 | 1970 | 15 | |
| K III | University of Innsbruck | c. 46°50′N 10°47′E | c. 3275 | 1970 | 15 | |
| K IV | University of Innsbruck | c. 46°50′N 10°47′E | c. 3225 | 1970 | 16 | |
| K V | University of Innsbruck | c. 46°50′N 10°47′E | c. 3175 | 1970 | 16 | |
| K S | University of Innsbruck | c. 46°50′N 10°47′E | c. 3125 | 1970 | 11 | |
| K VII | University of Innsbruck | c. 46°50′N 10°47′E | c. 3082 | 1970 | 7 | |
| Vallée Blanche | CNRS | c. 45°53′N 6°56′E | c. 3550 | 1970 | 33 | |
| Vallée Blanche | CNRS | 45°53′N 6°56′E | 3500 | 1971 | 40 | |
| Vallée Blanche | CNRS | 45°53′N 6°56′E | 3500 | 1971 | 40 | |
| Vallée Blanche | CNRS | 45°53′N 6°56′E | 3500 | 1971 | 187 | |
| P 1 | University of Bern | c. 46°33′N 8°0′E | 3470 | 1972 | c. 9 | |
| P 2 | University of Bern | c. 46°33′N 8°0′E | 3470 | 1972 | c. 10 | |
| Col du Dôme | CNRS | c. 45°50′N 7°0′E | 4280 | 1973 | 25 | |
| Col du Dôme | CNRS | 45°50′N 7°8′E | 4785 | 1973 | 17 | |
| PM 1 | University of Bern | c. 46°24′N 7°32′E | 2750 | 1974 | 4 | |
| PM 2 | University of Bern | c. 46°24′N 7°32′E | 2750 | 1974 | 2 | |
| PM 3 | University of Bern | c. 46°24′N 7°32′E | 2750 | 1974 | 2 | |
| P3 | University of Bern | c. 46°33′N 8°0′E | 3470 | 1974 | c. 19 | |
| Col du Dôme | CNRS | c. 45°50′N 7°8′E | 4250 | 1976 | 31 | |
| Colle Gnifetti | University of Bern | 45°56′N 7°46′E | 4450 | 1976 | 33 | |
| Ewigsch-Neefeld | University of Bern | c. 46°33′N 8°3′E | 3370 | 1976 | 29 | |
| Ewigsch-Neefeld | University of Bern | c. 46°33′N 8°3′E | 3370 | 1977 | 35 | |
| Ewigsch-Neefeld | University of Bern | c. 46°33′N 8°3′E | 3410 | 1977 | 36 | |
| Ewigsch-Neefeld | University of Bern | c. 46°33′N 8°3′E | 3440 | 1977 | 39 | |
| Ewigsch-Neefeld | University of Bern | c. 46°33′N 8°3′E | 3440 | 1977 | 35 | |
| Colle Gnifetti | University of Bern | 45°56′N 7°46′E | 4450 | 1977 | 55 | |
| Colle Gnifetti | University of Bern | 45°56′N 7°46′E | 4450 | 1977 | 65 | |
| Col du Dôme (1) | Ice Memory Project (University of Grenoble Alpes Foundation) | | c. 4300 | 2016 | 126 | |
| Col du Dôme (2) | Ice Memory Project (University of Grenoble Alpes Foundation) | | c. 4300 | 2016 | 128 | |
| Col du Dôme (3) | Ice Memory Project (University of Grenoble Alpes Foundation) | | c. 4300 | 2016 | 129 | |

=== Iceland ===
| Core | Institution or project | Coords | Altitude (metres) | Drill dates | Depth (metres) | Sources |
|---|---|---|---|---|---|---|
| Langjökull | University of Iceland | c. 64°40′N 20°10′W | | 1968 | 30 | |
| Bárðarbunga | University of Iceland | c. 64°36′N 17°36′W | 1800 | 1968 | 42 | |
| Bárðarbunga | University of Iceland | c. 64°36′N 17°36′W | 2000 | 1969 | 104 | |
| Bárðarbunga | University of Iceland | c. 64°36′N 17°36′W | 1800 | 1970 | 27 | |
| Bárðarbunga | University of Iceland | c. 64°36′N 17°36′W | 2000 | 1972 | 415 | |

=== Scandinavia ===
| Core | Institution or project | Coords | Altitude (metres) | Drill dates | Depth (metres) | Sources |
|---|---|---|---|---|---|---|
| Svartisen | Cambridge University | c. 66°40′N 14°0′E | 1368 | 1964 | 17 | |
| Svartisen | Cambridge University | c. 66°40′N 14°0′E | 1322 | 1964 | 8 | |
| Svartisen | Cambridge University | c. 66°40′N 14°0′E | 1121 | 1964 | 17 | |
| Tarfala | Stockholm University | c. 67°25′N 18°20′E | | 1973 | 20 | |

=== Spitzbergen ===
| Core | Institution or project | Coords | Altitude (metres) | Drill dates | Depth (metres) | Sources |
|---|---|---|---|---|---|---|
| Ice Divide | AARI | c. 78°30′N 14°25′E | 450 | 1967 | 8 | |
| Ice Divide | AARI | c. 78°30′N 14°25′E | 450 | 1975 | 211 | |
| Ice Divide | AARI | c. 78°30′N 14°25′E | 450 | 1975 | 10 | |
| West Spitzbergen | USSR Academy of Science | | | 1976 | 211 | |
| Lomonosov Glacier | USSR Academy of Science | | | 1977 | 210 | |
| Spitzbergen | | | | 1975-1987 | 114-567 (9 holes) | (Note: It is not clear from the source whether these include any of the cores listed above.) |

== North America ==
=== Canada ===
| Core | Institution or project | Coords | Altitude (metres) | Drill dates | Depth (metres) | Sources |
|---|---|---|---|---|---|---|
| Hole 1 | USAF CRL | c. 85°30′N 90°0′W | c. 4 | 1952 | 16 | |
| Penny Ice Cap | AINA | c. 65°30′N 67°0′W | c. 1800 | 1953 | 10 | |
| Penny Ice Cap | AINA | c. 65°30′N 67°0′W | c. 1800 | 1953 | 10 | |
| Penny Ice Cap | AINA | c. 65°30′N 67°0′W | c. 1800 | 1953 | 18 | |
| Hole 2 | USAF CRL | c. 85°30′N 90°0′W | c. 4 | 1953 | 16-33 | |
| Hole 3 | USAF CRL | c. 85°30′N 90°0′W | c. 4 | 1953 | 28 | |
| Penny Ice Cap A1 | AINA | 66°58′N 65°29′W | 2080 | 1953 | 21 | |
| Hole 4 | USAF CRL | c. 83°30′N 88°0′W | c. 4 | 1955 | 12 | |
| Hole 5 | USAF CRL | c. 83°30′N 88°0′W | c. 4 | 1955 | 17 | |
| Hole 6 | USAF CRL | c. 83°30′N 88°0′W | c. 4 | 1955 | 15 | |
| Hole 7 | USAF CRL | c. 83°30′N 88°0′W | c. 4 | 1955 | 15 | |
| Hole 8 | USAF CRL | c. 83°30′N 88°0′W | c. 4 | 1955 | 21 | |
| Hole 9 | USAF CRL | c. 83°30′N 88°0′W | c. 4 | 1955 | 25 | |
| Trough | SUNY Buffalo | 83°11′N 74°23′W | c. 3 | 1960 | 35 | |
| Ridge | SUNY Buffalo | 83°10′N 74°22′W | 7 | 1960 | 35 | |
| Reentrant | SUNY Buffalo | c. 83°07′N 71°47′W | c. 3 | 1960 | 11 | |
| Rise | SUNY Buffalo | c. 83°08′N 74°5′W | 27 | 1960 | 52 | |
| Site Q | Hokkaido University | c. 82°20′N 96°0′W | 4 | 1960 | 35 | |
| Site T | Hokkaido University | c. 82°20′N 96°0′W | 1 | 1960 | 8 | |
| Kaskawulsh Glacier 1 | University of Alberta | 60°44′N 139°42′W | 2520 | 1963 | 7 | |
| Kaskawulsh Glacier 2 | University of Alberta | c. 60°47′N 139°45′W | 2650 | 1963 | 4 | |
| Meighen Ice Cap | PCSP | c. 79°54′N 99°6′W | 260 | 1965 | 121 | |
| Devon 71 | PCSP | 75°18′N 82°18′W | c. 1800 | 1972 | 230 | |
| B0 | University of Minnesota | c. 69°43′N 71°58′W | c. 590 | 1971 | 10 | |
| B1 | University of Minnesota | c. 69°43′N 71°58′W | c. 600 | 1971 | 17 | |
| B1 | University of Minnesota | c. 69°43′N 71°58′W | c. 590 | 1971 | 8 | |
| B2 | University of Minnesota | c. 69°43′N 71°58′W | c. 610 | 1972 | 22 | |
| Devon 72 | PCSP | 75°18′N 82°18′W | 1800 | 1972 | 299 | |
| Devon Camp | PCSP | 75°18′N 82°18′W | 1800 | 1972 | 10 | |
| T3 | Nagoya University | Various | c. 4 | 1973 | 30 | (Note: Drifting ice island.) |
| T3 | Nagoya University | Various | c. 4 | 1973 | 31 | |
| Devon 73 | PCSP | 75°18′N 82°18′W | 1800 | 1973 | 299 | |
| Devon | PCSP | 75°18′N 82°18′W | 1800 | 1974 | 12 | |
| South Cape | PCSP | 76°52′N 86°5′W | 1402 | 1974 | 12 | |
| Saddle | PCSP | 76°38′N 79°25′W | 902 | 1974 | 12 | |
| Parrish Glacier | PCSP | 79°50′N 76°40′W | 1760 | 1974 | 12 | |
| Central 1 | PCSP | 78°3′N 81°0′W | 1266 | 1974 | 12 | |
| Central 2 | PCSP | 78°34′N 79°30′W | 1688 | 1974 | 12 | |
| Mer de Glace | PCSP | 80°46′N 73°30′W | 1820 | 1974 | 12 | |
| Axel Heiberg | PCSP | 79°46′N 91°13′W | 1840 | 1974 | 12 | |
| Ellesmere Island Site 1 | McGill University | 78°25′N 80°0′W | 1387 | 1974 | 26 | |
| Ellesmere Island Site 2 | McGill University | 77°33′N 80°20′W | 1346 | 1974 | 22 | |
| Ellesmere Island Site 3 | McGill University | 76°38′N 78°22′W | 658 | 1974 | 10 | |
| Ellesmere Island Site 4 | PCSP | 76°35′N 79°45′W | 903 | 1974 | 4 | |
| T0975 | University of Minnesota | 69°52′N 72°5′W | 508 | 1975 | 53 | |
| NW Col | California DoE | 60°34′N 140°24′W | 5339 | 1975 | 16 | |
| NW Col | California DoE | 60°34′N 140°41′W | 5339 | 1976 | 8 | |
| T061 | University of Minnesota | 69°48′N 72°7′W | 745 | 1976 | 223 | |
| T081 | University of Minnesota | 69°51′N 72°6′W | 745 | 1977 | c. 160 | |
| Mer de Glace Agassiz | PCSP | c. 80°46′N 73°30′W | c. 1820 | 1977 | 337 | |
| Mer de Glace Agassiz | PCSP | c. 80°46′N 73°30′W | c. 1820 | 1977 | 20 | |
| Mount Logan | California DoE | 60°34′N 140°24′W | 5339 | 1978 | 19 | |
| TO20 | University of Minnesota | 69°45′N 72°9′W | 862 | 1978 | 300 | |
| Mer de Glace Agassiz | PCSP | c. 80°47′N 73°30′W | c. 1850 | 1979 | 149 | |
| Mount Logan | | 60°35′N 140°35′W | 5340 | 1980 | 103 | |
| Mount Logan | GSC | 60°35′N 140°30′W | 5300 | 2001-2002 | 186 | |

=== Greenland ===
| Site/core | Institution or project | Coords | Altitude (metres) | Drill dates | Depth (metres) | Sources |
|---|---|---|---|---|---|---|
| Camp IV | EPF | 69°40′N 49°31′W | 1098 | 1949 | 50 | |
| Camp VI | EPF | 69°42′N 48°16′W | 1598 | 1950 | 47 | |
| Camp VI | EPF | 69°42′N 48°16′W | 1598 | 1950 | 126 | |
| Milcent | EPF | 70°18′04″N 44°33′13″W | 2450 | 1950 | 52 | |
| Station Centrale | EPF | 70°55′N 40°38′W | 2994 | 1950 | 55 | |
| Station Centrale | EPF | 70°55′N 40°38′W | 2994 | 1950 | 151 | |
| Station Centrale | EPF | 70°55′N 40°38′W | 2994 | 1950 | 31 | |
| FD-32 | | 66°16′N 47°46′W | 1828 | 1953 | 10 | |
| Site 2 | SIPRE | 76°59′N 56°04′W | 2100 | 1954 | 48 | |
| Site 2 | SIPRE | 76°59′N 56°04′W | 2100 | 1956 | 305 | |
| Site 2 | SIPRE | 76°59′N 56°04′W | 2100 | 1957 | 411 | |
| Camp Century | CRREL | 77°10′N 61°08′W | 1885 | 1961 | 186 | |
| Camp Century | CRREL | 77°10′N 61°08′W | 1885 | 1962 | 238 | |
| Camp Century | CRREL | 77°10′N 61°08′W | 1885 | 1963–1966 | 1388 | |
| Camp Century | CRREL | 77°10′N 61°08′W | 1885 | 1964 | 12 | |
| Hole 1 | AINA/USAF CRL | 77°55′N 39°14′W | 2402 | 1966 | 60 | |
| Hole 2 | AINA/USAF CRL | 77°55′N 39°14′W | 2402 | 1966 | 60 | |
| Hole 3 | AINA/USAF CRL | 77°55′N 39°14′W | 2402 | 1966 | 51 | |
| Hole 4 | AINA/USAF CRL | 77°55′N 39°11′W | 2402 | 1966 | 60 | |
| Carrefour | EGIG | 69°49′N 47°26′W | 1849 | 1967 | 20 | |
| Carrefour | EGIG | 69°49′N 47°26′W | 1849 | 1967 | 10 | |
| Carrefour | EGIG | 69°49′N 47°26′W | 1850 | 1968 | 22 | |
| Milcent | EGIG | 70°18′N 44°33′W | 2450 | 1968 | 11 | |
| Station Centrale | EGIG | 70°55′N 40°38′W | 2994 | 1968 | 35 | |
| Crête | EGIG | 71°07′N 37°19′W | 3174 | 1968 | 30 | |
| Jarl Joset | EGIG | 71°21′N 33°29′W | 2867 | 1968 | 12 | |
| Depot 420 | EGIG | 72°14′N 32°20′W | c. 2750 | 1968 | 12 | |
| Depot 480 | EGIG | 72°6′N 30°0′W | 2500 | 1968 | 20 | |
| Dye 3 | GISP | 65°11′N 43°50′W | 2480 | 1971 | 25 | |
| Dye 3 | GISP | 65°11′N 43°49′W | 2486 | 1971 | 372 | |
| North Site | GISP | 75°46′N 42°27′W | 2842 | 1972 | 15 | |
| Crête | GISP | 71°07′N 37°19′W | 3172 | 1972 | 15 | (Note: The altitude is assumed here to be the same as that of the other Crête cores at the same coordinates.) |
| Milcent | GISP | 70°18′N 45°35′W | 2450 | 1973 | 398 | |
| Dye 2 | GISP | 66°23′N 46°11′W | 2200 | 1973 | 50 | (Note: The altitude is assumed here to be the same as that of the other Dye 2 cores at the same coordinates.) |
| Summit | GISP | 71°17′N 37°56′W | 3244 | 1974 | 31 | (Note: MacKinnon gives the coordinates as 72°17′N 37°56′W) |
| Crête | GISP | 71°07′N 37°19′W | 3174 | 1974 | 23 | |
| Crête | GISP | 71°07′N 37°19′W | 3174 | 1974 | 50 | |
| Crête | GISP | 71°07′N 37°19′W | 3172 | 1974 | 405 | |
| Dye 2 | GISP | 66°23′N 46°11′W | 2200 | 1974 | 23 | |
| Dye 2 | GISP | 66°23′N 46°11′W | 2200 | 1974 | 50 | |
| Dye 2 | GISP | 66°23′N 46°11′W | 2200 | 1974 | 101 | |
| V | McGill University | 77°4′N 70°25′W | 1173 | 1974 | 7 | |
| VI | McGill University | 76°46′N 64°35′W | 1560 | 1974 | 22 | |
| Dye 3 | GISP | 65°11′N 43°49′W | 2486 | 1975 | 95 | |
| Dye 3 | GISP | 65°11′N 43°50′W | 2480 | 1975 | 378 | |
| South Dome | GISP | 63°33′N 44°36′W | 2854 | 1975 | 80 | |
| South Dome | GISP | 63°33′N 44°36′W | 2854 | 1975 | 30 | |
| Hans Tausen | GISP | 82°30′N 38°20′W | 1271 | 1975 | 60 | |
| Hans Tausen | GISP | 82°30′N 38°20′W | 1271 | 1976 | 50 | |
| Hans Tausen | Hans Tausen | 82°30′N 38°20′W | 1290 | 1995 | 346 | |
| D 6 | GISP | 65°12′N 43°47′W | 2488 | 1975 | 11 | |
| DS-1 | GISP | 63°36′N 44°55′W | 1847 | 1975 | 11 | |
| DS-2 | GISP | 63°33′N 44°56′W | 2503 | 1975 | 11 | |
| DS-3 | GISP | 63°42′N 44°32′W | 2488 | 1975 | 11 | |
| South Dome | GISP | 63°33′N 44°36′W | 2854 | 1975 | 11 | |
| ST-1 | GISP | 65°18′N 43°47′W | 2476 | 1975 | 12 | |
| SDS-1 | GISP | 65°42′N 44°46′W | 2620 | 1975 | 11 | |
| SDS-2 | GISP | 65°32′N 44°7′W | 2618 | 1975 | 11 | |
| SDS-3 | GISP | 65°50′N 44°7′W | 2640 | 1975 | 11 | |
| SAS | GISP | 65°40′N 44°19′W | 2637 | 1975 | 11 | |
| SN | GISP | 66°11′N 43°40′W | 2574 | 1975 | 11 | |
| SNS-1 | GISP | 66°28′N 44°50′W | 2457 | 1975 | 11 | |
| SNS-2 | GISP | 65°55′N 42°43′W | 2365 | 1975 | 11 | |
| A-1 | GISP | 67°27′N 41°59′W | 2670 | 1975 | 11 | |
| A-1-S-1 | GISP | 67°2′N 41°51′W | 2563 | 1975 | 11 | |
| A-1-S-2 | GISP | 67°51′N 43°7′W | 2606 | 1975 | 11 | |
| D-4 | GISP | c. 65°12′N 43°47′W | 2490 | 1975 | 11 | |
| D-5 | GISP | c. 65°12′N 43°47′W | 2490 | 1975 | 11 | |
| Dye 2 | GISP | 66°23′N 46°11′W | 2200 | 1975 | 20 | |
| Dye 3 | GISP | 65°11′N 43°49′W | 2486 | 1976 | 93 | |
| Dye 2 | GISP | 66°23′N 46°11′W | 2200 | 1977 | 84 | |
| Camp Century | GISP | 77°10′N 61°08′W | 1885 | 1977 | 100 | |
| Camp Century | GISP | 77°11′N 61°5′W | 1890 | 1977 | 101 | |
| Camp Century | GISP | 77°13′N 60°48′W | 1922 | 1977 | 78 | |
| Camp Century | GISP | 77°13′N 60°48′W | 1922 | 1977 | 71 | |
| North Central 1 | GISP | 74°37′N 39°36′W | 2941 | 1977 | 100 | |
| North Central 2 | GISP | 74°37′N 39°36′W | 2941 | 1977 | c. 109 | |
| North Central | GISP | 74°37′N 39°36′W | 2941 | 1977 | 102 | |
| Dye 3 | GISP | 65°11′N 43°50′W | 2480 | 1978 | c. 90 | |
| Camp III | GISP | 69°43′N 50°08′W | 615 | 1977 | 49 | (Note: MacKinnon gives the date of this core as 1978.) |
| Camp III | GISP | 69°43′N 50°08′W | 615 | 1978 | 80 | (Note: MacKinnon gives the depth of this core as 90.) |
| Dye 3 | GISP | 65°11′N 43°49′W | 2486 | 1979–1981 | 2037 | |
| Site A core 1 | GISP | 70°38′6″N 36°10′48″W | 3092 | 1985 | 96 | |
| Site A core 2 | GISP | 70°38′6″N 36°10′48″W | 3092 | 1985 | 129 | |
| Site B | GISP | 70°39′3″N 38°31′16″W | 3138 | 1984 | 106 | |
| Site C | GISP | 70°40′37″N 39°12′47″W | 3072 | 1984 | 25 | |
| Site D | GISP | 70°38′23″N 40°22′56″W | 3018 | 1984 | 100 | |
| Site E | GISP | 71°45′33″N 36°8′58″W | 3087 | 1985 | 78 | |
| Site F | GISP | 71°29′31″N 36°7′8″W | 3092 | 1985 | 26 | |
| Site G | GISP | 71°9′18″N 36°9′44″W | 3098 | 1985 | 71 | |
| Site H | GISP | 70°51′54″N 36°9′43″W | 3102 | 1985 | 26 | |
| Renland | | 71°18′N 26°42′W | 2340 | 1988 | 324 | |
| Summit | GRIP | 72°34′44.4″N 37°33′55.2″W | 3232 | 1989–1992 | 3029 | |
| GISP2 core D | | 72°35′N 38°28′W | 3053 | 1989–1993 | 3053 | |
| GISP2 core G1 | | 72°35′N 38°28′W | 3203 | 1990 | 103 | |
| GISP2 core G2 | | 72°35′N 38°28′W | 3203 | 1991 | 110 | |
| NASA-U-1 | PARCA | 73°51′N 49°30′W | 2369 | 1995 | 151 | |
| NASA-U-2 | PARCA | 73°51′N 49°30′W | 2369 | 1995 | 21 | |
| NASA-U-3 | PARCA | 73°51′N 49°30′W | 2369 | 1995 | 20 | |
| Humboldt-M | PARCA | 78°32′N 56°50′W | 1995 | 1995 | 147 | |
| Humboldt-N | PARCA | 78°45′N 56°50′W | 1905 | 1995 | 21 | |
| Humboldt-E | PARCA | 78°36′N 55°42′W | 2045 | 1995 | 21 | |
| Humboldt-S | PARCA | 78°19′N 56°50′W | 2058 | 1995 | 21 | |
| Humboldt-W | PARCA | 78°27′N 56°57′W | 1924 | 1995 | 21 | |
| GITS-Core 1 | PARCA | 77°9′N 61°6′W | 1887 | 1996 | 22 | |
| GITS-Core 2 | PARCA | 77°9′N 61°6′W | 1887 | 1996 | 121 | |
| Tunu-1 | PARCA | 78°1′N 34°0′W | 2113 | 1996 | 69 | |
| Tunu-2 | PARCA | 78°1′N 34°0′W | 2113 | 1996 | 19 | |
| Tunu-N25 | PARCA | 78°20′N 33°53′W | c. 2050 | 1996 | 15 | |
| Tunu-E25 | PARCA | 78°0′N 32°56′W | c. 1990 | 1996 | 12 | |
| Tunu-W25 | PARCA | 78°2′N 35°4′W | c. 2460 | 1996 | 15 | |
| Tunu-N50 | PARCA | 78°28′N 33°50′W | c. 2050 | 1996 | 15 | |
| Tunu-E50 | PARCA | 77°59′N 31°52′W | c. 2090 | 1996 | 15 | |
| Tunu-W50 | PARCA | 78°2′N 36°8′W | c. 2470 | 1996 | 15 | |
| South Dome-1 | PARCA | 63°9′N 44°49′W | 2850 | 1997 | 25 | |
| South Dome-2 | PARCA | 63°9′N 44°49′W | 2850 | 1997 | 15 | |
| Tunu South-1 | PARCA | 69°30′N 34°30′W | 2650 | 1997 | 21 | |
| Tunu South-2 | PARCA | 69°30′N 34°30′W | 2650 | 1997 | 10 | |
| Tunu South-3 | PARCA | 69°30′N 34°30′W | 2650 | 1997 | 10 | |
| NASA East-1 | PARCA | 75°0′N 30°0′W | 2631 | 1997 | 21 | |
| NASA East-2 | PARCA | 75°0′N 30°0′W | 2631 | 1997 | 11 | |
| 7147 | PARCA | 71°3′N 47°14′W | 2134 | 1997 | 20 | |
| 7247 | PARCA | 71°56′N 47°29′W | 2277 | 1997 | 20 | |
| 7551 | PARCA | 75°0′N 51°0′W | c. 2200 | 1997 | 21 | |
| 7653-1 | PARCA | 76°0′N 53°0′W | c. 2200 | 1997 | 15 | |
| 7653-2 | PARCA | 76°0′N 53°0′W | c. 2200 | 1997 | 5 | |
| N. Dye 3 | PARCA | 66°0′N 44°30′W | 2640 | 1997 | 19 | |
| N. Dye 3 | PARCA | 66°0′N 44°30′W | 2640 | 1997 | 17 | |
| 6945-1 | PARCA | 69°0′N 45°0′W | c. 2150 | 1998 | 19 | |
| 6943 | PARCA | 69°12′N 43°0′W | c. 2500 | 1998 | 12 | |
| 6941 | PARCA | 69°24′N 41°0′W | c. 2765 | 1998 | 12 | |
| 6939 | PARCA | 69°36′N 39°0′W | c. 2955 | 1998 | 12 | |
| 6841 | PARCA | 68°0′N 41°0′W | c. 2640 | 1998 | 12 | |
| 6745 | PARCA | 67°30′N 45°0′W | c. 2250 | 1998 | 12 | |
| 6839 | PARCA | 68°30′N 39°30′W | c. 2790 | 1998 | 12 | |
| 6938 | PARCA | 69°0′N 38°0′W | c. 2920 | 1998 | 12 | |
| 6642-2 | PARCA | 66°30′N 42°30′W | c. 2380 | 1998 | 21 | |
| 6345 | PARCA | 63°48′N 45°0′W | c. 2730 | 1998 | 15 | |
| 6348 | PARCA | 63°48′N 45°0′W | c. 1960 | 1998 | 15 | |
| 7249 | PARCA | 72°12′N 49°24′W | c. 2170 | 1998 | 15 | |
| 7347 | PARCA | 73°36′N 47°12′W | c. 2600 | 1998 | 12 | |
| 7345 | PARCA | 73°0′N 45°0′W | c. 2815 | 1998 | 15 | |
| 7145 | PARCA | 71°30′N 45°0′W | c. 2615 | 1998 | 12 | |
| 7245 | PARCA | 72°15′N 45°0′W | c. 2770 | 1998 | 12 | |
| Flade Isblink | U. Copenhagen | 81°17′33.36″N 15°42′10.44″W | 1290 | 2006 | 425 | |
| NorthGRIP | NorthGRIP | 75°6′N 42°18′W | 2959 | 1996–2003 | 3080 | |
| NEEM | NEEM | 77°27′N 51°4′W | 2484 | 2008–2010 | 2537 | |
| EastGRIP | EastGRIP | 75°38′N 35°59′W | 2708 | 2015–2020 | | |

=== United States ===
| Core | Institution or project | Coords | Altitude (metres) | Drill dates | Depth (metres) | Sources |
|---|---|---|---|---|---|---|
| Taku Glacier | AGS | 58°33′N 134°8′W | 1110 | 1950 | 91 | |
| Mount Wrangell | University of Alaska | c. 62°0′N 144°0′W | c. 4200 | 1961 | 10 | |
| Mount Wrangell | University of Alaska | c. 62°0′N 144°0′W | c. 4200 | 1961 | 10 | |
| Mount Wrangell | University of Alaska | c. 62°0′N 144°0′W | c. 4200 | 1961 | 10 | |
| Mount Wrangell | University of Alaska | c. 62°0′N 144°0′W | c. 4200 | 1961 | 10 | |
| Blue Glacier | University of California | 47°49′N 123°41′W | c. 1325 | 1962 | 137 | |
| Blue Glacier | University of Washington | 47°49′N 123°41′W | c. 1325 | 1971 | 40 | |
| Blue Glacier | University of Washington | 47°49′N 123°41′W | c. 1325 | 1971 | 90 | |
| Mount Wrangell | | 62°0′N 144°0′W | 4000 | 1982 | 46 | (Note: Benson gives a map from which the altitude can be seen to be between 4060 m and 4070 m.) |

== Oceania ==
=== New Zealand ===
| Core | Institution or project | Coords | Altitude (metres) | Drill dates | Depth (metres) | Sources |
|---|---|---|---|---|---|---|
| Tasman Glacier | NZGS | c. 43°30′S 170°15′E | 2340 | 1970 | 12 | |

== South America ==
=== Bolivia ===
| Core | Institution or project | Coords | Altitude (metres) | Drill dates | Depth (metres) | Sources |
|---|---|---|---|---|---|---|
| Illimani glacier (1) | Ice Memory Project (University of Grenoble Alpes Foundation) | | 6309 | 2017 | 137 | |
| Illimani glacier (2) | Ice Memory Project (University of Grenoble Alpes Foundation) | | 6309 | 2017 | 134 | |

=== Peru ===
| Core | Institution or project | Coords | Altitude (metres) | Drill dates | Depth (metres) | Sources |
|---|---|---|---|---|---|---|
| Summit | IPS | 13°56′S 70°50′W | 5650 | 1976 | 7 | |
| Middle Dome | IPS | 13°56′S 70°50′W | 5650 | 1976 | 15 | |
| South Dome | IPS | 13°56′S 70°50′W | 5650 | 1976 | 16 | |
| Summit | IPS | 13°56′S 70°50′W | 5650 | 1976 | 15 | |
| Huascaran | | | 6048 | 1993 | 160, 166 | |

== See also ==
- List of Arctic research programs
- List of research stations in the Arctic
- Research stations in Antarctica

== Sources ==
- Abram, Nerilie J.; Mulvaney, Robert; Wolff, Eric W.; Mudelsee, Manfred (2007). "Ice core records as sea ice proxies: An evaluation from the Weddell Sea region of Antarctica" (PDF). Journal of Geophysical Research. 112 (D15): 1–13. Bibcode:2007JGRD..11215101A. CiteSeerX 10.1.1.473.4635. doi:10.1029/2006JD008139.
- Alley, R.B.; Koci, B.R. (1988). "Ice-core analysis at Site A, Greenland: preliminary results". Annals of Glaciology. 10: 1–4. Bibcode:1988AnGla..10....1A. CiteSeerX 10.1.1.476.6746. doi:10.1017/S0260305500004067.
- Aristarain, A.J. (1981). "First glaciological studies on the James Ross Island ice cap, Antarctic peninsula". Journal of Glaciology. 27 (97): 371–379. Bibcode:1981JGlac..27..371A. doi:10.1017/S0022143000011412.
- Benson, Carl S. (1984). "Ice core drilling on Mt. Wrangell, Alaska 1982". In Holdsworth, G.; et al. (eds.). Ice Drilling Technology. Hanover, New Hampshire: Cold Regions Research and Engineering Laboratory. pp. 61–68.
- Bentley, Charles R.; Koci, Bruce R. (2007). "Drilling to the beds of the Greenland and Antarctic ice sheets: a review". Annals of Glaciology. 47 (1): 1–9. Bibcode:2007AnGla..47....1B. doi:10.3189/172756407786857695.
- Bird, I.G. (1976). "Thermal ice drilling: Australian developments and experience". In Splettstoesser, John F. (ed.). Ice-Core Drilling. Lincoln, Nebraska: University of Nebraska Press. pp. 1–18. ISBN 978-0-8032-5843-3.
- Bory, A.J.; Biscaye, P.E.; Piotrowski, A.M.; Steffensen, J.P. (2003). "Regional variability of ice core dust composition and provenance in Greenland". Geochem. Geophys. Geosyst. 4 (12): 1107. Bibcode:2003GGG.....4.1107B. doi:10.1029/2003GC000627. S2CID 129148230.
- Dahl-Jensen, Dorthe; Kirk, Marie; Larsen, Lars.B.; Sheldon, Simon G.; Steffensen, J.P. "Field season 2016: East GReenland Ice core Project (EGRIP) 2015–2020: Establishing the EGRIP drilling camp" (PDF). Ice and Climate Group, Niels Bohr Institute. Archived from the original (PDF) on 2017-04-09.
- Etheridge, D.M.; et al. (1992). "Changes in tropospheric methane between 1841 and 1978 from a high-accumulation-rate Antarctic ice core". Tellus B. 44 (4): 282–294. Bibcode:1992TellB..44..282E. doi:10.1034/j.1600-0889.1992.t01-3-00006.x.
- Gillet, F.; et al. (1976). "A new electrothermal drill for coring in ice". In Splettstoesser, John F. (ed.). Ice-Core Drilling. Lincoln, Nebraska: University of Nebraska Press. pp. 19–27. ISBN 978-0-8032-5843-3.
- Gillet, F. (1984). "Ice core quality in electro-mechanical drilling". In Holdsworth, G.; et al. (eds.). Ice Drilling Technology. Hanover, New Hampshire: Cold Regions Research and Engineering Laboratory. pp. 73–80.
- Goodwin, Bradley P.; Mosley-Thompson, Ellen; Wilson, Aaron B.; Porter, Stacy; Sierra-Hernandez, M. Roxana (1 April 2016). "Accumulation Variability in the Antarctic Peninsula: The Role of Large-Scale Atmospheric Oscillations and Their Interactions" (PDF). Journal of Climate. 29 (7): 2579–2596. Bibcode:2016JCli...29.2579G. doi:10.1175/JCLI-D-15-0354.1.
- Hofstede, Coen M.; et al. (2004). "Firn accumulation records for the past 1000 years on the basis of dielectric profiling of six cores from DronningMaud Land, Antarctica". Journal of Glaciology. 50 (169): 279–291. Bibcode:2004JGlac..50..279H. doi:10.3189/172756504781830169.
- Holdsworth, G. (1984). "The Canadian Rufli-Rand electro-mechanical core drill and reaming devices". In Holdsworth, G.; et al. (eds.). Ice Drilling Technology. Hanover, New Hampshire: Cold Regions Research and Engineering Laboratory. pp. 21–32.
- Holdsworth, G. (2004). "Ice core climate signals from Mount Logan, Yukon A.D. 1700-1897". In Bradley, Raymond S.; Jones, Philip D. (eds.). Climate Since A.D. 1500 (reprint of 1995 2nd revised ed.). London: Routledge. pp. 483–504. ISBN 978-0-415-07593-0.
- Johnsen, S.J.; et al. (1992). "Irregular glacial interstadials recorded in a new Greenland ice core". Nature. 359 (6393): 311–313. Bibcode:1992Natur.359..311J. doi:10.1038/359311a0. S2CID 4364364.
- Jouzel, J. (2013). "A brief history of ice core science over the last 50 yr". Climate of the Past. 9 (6): 2525–2547. Bibcode:2013CliPa...9.2525J. doi:10.5194/cp-9-2525-2013.
- Kolobov, D.D.; Savatyugin, L.M. (October–December 1982). "Bottom sediments under the Novolazarevskiy ice shelf". Polar Geography and Geology. VI (4): 267–271. doi:10.1080/10889378209377176.
- Korotkevich, Ye S. (1978). "Skvoznoye burenie shelfovogo lednika v raione stantsii Novolazarevskoy" [Through drilling a shelf glacier in the region of Novolazarev Station]. Soviet Antarctic Expedition Bulletin. 98: 49–52.
- Langway, C.C. (May 1967). "Stratigraphic analysis of a deep ice core from Greenland". CRREL Research Reports. 77: 1–71.
- Langway, Chester C. (1976). "The Polar Ice-Core Storage Facility at USA CRREL". In Splettstoesser, John (ed.). Ice-Core Drilling. Lincoln, Nebraska: University of Nebraska Press. pp. 71–75. ISBN 978-0803258433.
- Langway, Chester C.; Oeschger, H.; Dansgaard, W. (1985). "The Greenland Ice Sheet Program in Perspective". In Langway, Chester C.; Oeschger, H.; Dansgaard, W. (eds.). Greenland Ice Core: Geophysics, geochemistry, and the environment. Washington D.C.: American Geophysical Union. pp. 1–8. ISBN 978-0875900575.
- Langway, Chester C. (2008). "The history of early polar ice cores" (PDF). Cold Regions Science and Technology. 52 (2): 101–117. Bibcode:2008CRST...52..101L. doi:10.1016/j.coldregions.2008.01.001. hdl:11681/5296. Archived from the original (PDF) on 2016-11-18.
- Langway, Chester C.; Chiang, Erick (December 1976). "Ice core storage and information exchange". Antarctic Journal: 290–291.
- Langway, Chester C.; Chiang, Erick (October 1977). "Central ice core storage facility and information exchange". Antarctic Journal: 154–156.
- Langway, Chester C.; Herron, Michael M. (October 1977). "Polar ice core analysis". Antarctic Journal: 152–154.
- Legrand, M.. (1997). "Glaciochemistry of polar ice cores: A review". Reviews of Geophysics. 35 (3): 219–243. Bibcode:1997RvGeo..35..219L. doi:10.1029/96RG03527. S2CID 55357216.
- Litwak, John (1984). "The PICO intermediate drill system". In Holdsworth, G.; et al. (eds.). Ice Drilling Technology. Hanover, New Hampshire: Cold Regions Research and Engineering Laboratory. pp. 41–44.
- MacKinnon, P.K. (1980). "Ice Cores". Glaciological Data. Washington DC: World Data Center A for Glaciology [Snow and Ice]. ISSN 0149-1776.
- Mock, Steven J. (November 1976). "Geodetic positions of borehole sites of the Greenland Ice Sheet Program". CRREL Reports. 76–41: 1–14. Archived from the original on April 7, 2017.
- Morgan, V.I.; McCray, A.P.; Wehrle, E. (1984). "Ice drilling at Cape Folger, Antarctica" (PDF). CRREL Reports. 84–34: 85–86. Archived from the original (PDF) on 2017-10-11.
- Morgan, V.I.; et al. (1997). "Site information and initial results from deep ice drilling on Law Dome, Antarctica". Journal of Glaciology. 43 (143): 3–10. Bibcode:1997JGlac..43....3M. doi:10.1017/S0022143000002768.
- Mosley-Thompson, E.; McConnell, J.R.; Bales, R.C.; Li, Z.; Lin, P.-N.; Steffen, K.; Thompson, L.G.; Edwards, R.; Bathke, D. (27 December 2001). "Local to regional-scale variability of annual net accumulation on the Greenland ice sheet from PARCA cores". Journal of Geophysical Research. 106 (D24): 33839–33851. Bibcode:2001JGR...10633839M. doi:10.1029/2001JD900067.
- Mulvaney, Robert; et al. (1992). "The ratio of MSA to non-sea-salt sulphate in Antarctic Peninsula ice cores". Tellus B. 44 (4): 295–303. Bibcode:1992TellB..44..295M. doi:10.1034/j.1600-0889.1992.t01-2-00007.x.
- Mulvaney, Robert; et al. (2002). "1000 year ice-core records from Berkner Island, Antarctica". Annals of Glaciology. 35: 45–51. Bibcode:2002AnGla..35...45M. doi:10.3189/172756402781817176.
- Osterberg, Erich C.; et al. (2014). "Mount Logan ice core record of tropical and solar influences on Aleutian Low variability: 500–1998 A.D." Journal of Geophysical Research: Atmospheres. 119 (19): 11189–11204. Bibcode:2014JGRD..11911189O. doi:10.1002/2014JD021847.
- Pasteur, E.C.; et al. (1995). "A 340 year record of biogenic sulphur froIn the Weddell Sea area, Antarctica". Annals of Glaciology. 21: 169–174. Bibcode:1995AnGla..21..169P. doi:10.1017/S0260305500015779.
- Patton, D.E.; Peterson, V.L.; Stonehocker, G.H.; Wright, J.W. (1965). Waynick, A.H. (ed.). Geomagnetism and Aeronomy. Washington D.C.: American Geophysical Union.
- Peel, David A.; et al. (1988). "Stable-isotope / air-temperature relationships in ice cores from Dolleman Island and the Palmer Land Plateau, Antarctic Peninsula" (PDF). Annals of Glaciology. 10: 130–136. Bibcode:1988AnGla..10..130P. doi:10.1017/S0260305500004304.
- Peel, D.A.; Mulvaney, R. (1992). "Time-trends in the pattern of ocean-atmosphere exchange in an ice core from the Weddell Sea sector of Antarctica". Tellus B. 44 (4): 430–442. Bibcode:1992TellB..44..430P. doi:10.1034/j.1600-0889.1992.00018.x.
- Peel, D.A. (2004). "Ice core evidence from the Antarctic Peninsula region". In Bradley, Raymond S.; Jones, Philip D. (eds.). Climate Since A.D. 1500 (reprint of 1995 2nd revised ed.). London: Routledge. pp. 549–571. ISBN 978-0-415-07593-0.
- Peel, David A.; et al. (2013). "Climatic Changes in the Atlantic Sector of Antarctica Over the Past 500 Years from Ice-Core and Other Evidence". In Jones, Philip Douglas; Bradley, Raymond Stephen; Jouzel, Jean (eds.). Climatic Variations and Forcing Mechanisms of the Last 200 Years. Berlin: Springer. pp. 1–8. ISBN 978-3-642-64700-0.
- Rapp, Donald (2012). Ice Ages and Interglacials: Measurements, Interpretation, and Models (2nd ed.). Chichester, UK: Springer. ISBN 978-3-642-30028-8.
- Rasmussen, S.O.; et al. (2013). "A first chronology for the North Greenland Eemian Ice Drilling (NEEM) ice core". Climate of the Past. 9 (6): 2713–2730. Bibcode:2013CliPa...9.2713R. doi:10.5194/cp-9-2713-2013.
- Thompson, L.G.; et al. (1994). "Climate since AD 1510 on Dyer Plateau, Antarctic Peninsula: evidence for recent climate change" (PDF). Annals of Glaciology. 20: 420–426. Bibcode:1994AnGla..20..420T. doi:10.3189/1994aog20-1-420-426.
- Thwaites, Richard J.; Wilson, Christopher; McCray, Anthony P. (1984). "Relationship between bore-hole closure and crystal fabrics in Antarctic ice core from Cape Folger" (PDF). Journal of Glaciology. 30 (105): 171–179. Bibcode:1984JGlac..30..171T. doi:10.1017/S0022143000005906.
- Ueda, Herbert T.; Talalay, Pavel G. (October 2007). "Fifty Years of Soviet and Russian Drilling Activity in Polar and Non-Polar Ice". Erdc/Crrel Tr-07-20. Archived from the original on April 20, 2017.
- Vasiliev, N.I.; et al. (2007). "Deep drilling at Vostok station, Antarctica: history and recent events". Annals of Glaciology. 47 (1): 10–23. Bibcode:2007AnGla..47...10V. doi:10.3189/172756407786857776.
- Weidick, Anker (1995). "Satellite Image Atlas of Glaciers of the World: Greenland" (PDF). United States Geological Survey Professional Papers. 1386-C: 1–153.
- Zagorodnov, V.; et al. (1998). "Antifreeze thermal ice core drilling: an effective approach to the acquisition of ice cores" (PDF). Cold Regions Science and Technology. 28 (3): 189–202. Bibcode:1998CRST...28..189Z. doi:10.1016/S0165-232X(98)00019-6.
- Zagorodnov, V.; Nagornov, O.; Scambos, T.A.; Muto, A.; Mosley-Thompson, E.; Pettit, E.C.; Tyuflin, S. (2012). "Borehole temperatures reveal details of 20th century warming at Bruce Plateau, Antarctic Peninsula". The Cryosphere. 6 (3): 675–686. Bibcode:2012TCry....6..675Z. doi:10.5194/tc-6-675-2012.
