= Greenland ice core project =

Project to drill through Greenland ice sheet

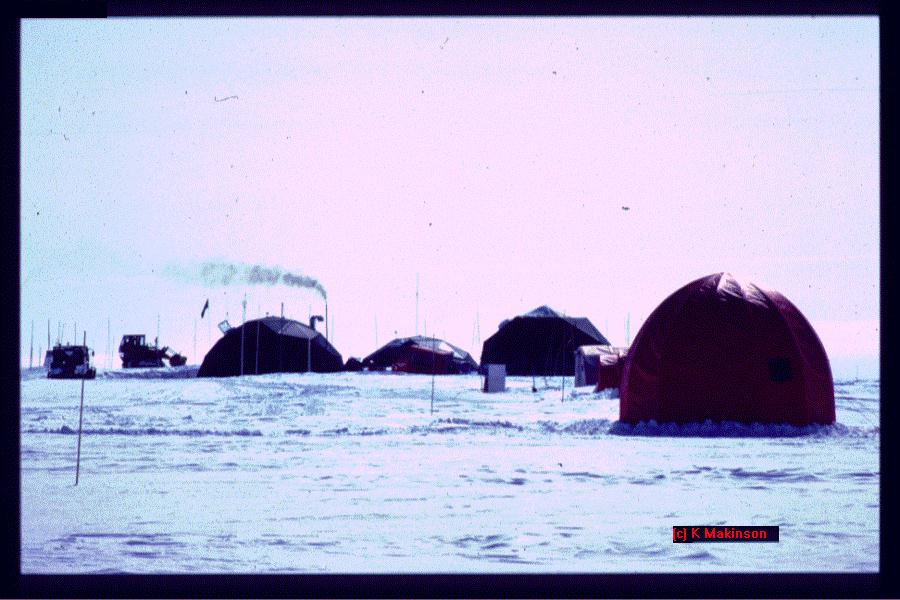
View of the GRIP site at Summit Camp

The Greenland Ice Core Project (GRIP) was a research project organized through the European Science Foundation (ESF). The project ran from 1989 to 1995, with drilling seasons from 1990 to 1992. In 1988, the project was accepted as an ESF-associated program, and the fieldwork was started in Greenland in the summer of 1989.

GRIP aimed to collect and investigate a 3000-meter-long ice core drilled at the apex of the Greenland ice sheet, known as the Summit of the ice cap. (Note: The location is different from nearby Summit Camp, which later took over the name "Summit" when the GRIP drill camp closed.) The Greenland ice sheet comprises more than 90% of the total ice sheet and glacier ice outside Antarctica.

The project was managed by a Steering Committee of the University of Bern's Physics Institute, chaired by Professor Bernhard Stauffer. Funding came from eight European nations (Belgium, Denmark, France, Germany, Iceland, Italy, Switzerland, and the United Kingdom), and from the European Union. Studies of nuclear isotopes and various atmospheric constituents provided by the cores allowed the team to construct detailed records of climate change, covering the last 100,000 years.

== Background ==
The loss of mass of the Greenland ice sheet has been accelerating due to the effects of climate change caused by human activities. The mass loss of ice sheets and glaciers causes sea levels to rise, terrestrial albedo to decline, and patterns of ocean circulation to change. It is predicted that the sea level will rise by approximately 7 meters if all the ice melts. The rise in sea levels due to ice sheet glaciers' melt would make it impossible for people to live in coastal regions.

Because there is no preserved ancient terrestrial sediment in Greenland, most ice sheet history is based on indirect records. Using the limited paleoclimate data, researchers have shown that the extent of ice in Greenland has changed significantly over time, and this suggests that the change in size is due to a variety of physical environmental factors. The best estimates based on the paleoclimate data show that the Greenland ice sheet is significantly reduced by even a small increase in the negative effects of climate change. A 2020 research paper suggests that the melting of the ice sheet that covers Greenland will accelerate much faster than previously predicted.

== Results and findings ==
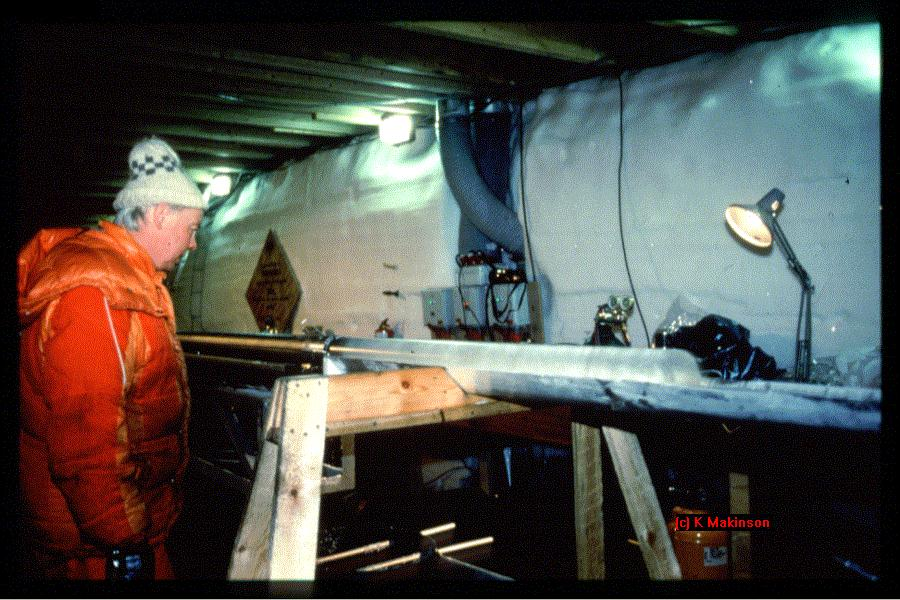
A portion of the core

Studies of nuclear isotopes and various atmospheric constituents provide detailed records of climate change over 100,000 years. From the analysis of the oxygen isotope ratio of the GRIP core excavated in 1992, it became clear that abrupt climate change occurred in Greenland during the last glacial period. This happened more than 20 times. It further became clear that the warm and cold periods alternated. Near the bottom of the GRIP core, oxygen isotope ratios fluctuated sharply; this was initially interpreted as an indication of repeated violent climate change during the last interglacial period in Greenland.

== Techniques ==
The first drilling of the Greenland Ice Core Project went only a few hundred meters into the glacier ice. But from 1989 to 1992 GRIP successfully drilled a 3029-meter ice core to the bed of the Greenland ice sheet at Summit (72°34.74′N 37°33.92′W). In 1991, ice cores 783 to 2482 meters long were drilled, and an ice core was drilled to bedrock in 1992. The ice core was first taken to the University of Copenhagen in Denmark, where it was stored in a cold room at -26 °C. Five sections of ice core with a length of about 300 to 400 mm were shipped to Japan. A wide range of information related to past and present climatic and environmental changes can be analyzed from the ice. The glacier layers that are collected can reveal up to 200,000 years of evidence.

Studies of isotopes and various atmospheric constituents in the core have provided a detailed record of climate variability reaching more than 100,000 years back in time. The results indicate that the Holocene climate was remarkably stable, but they confirm the occurrence of rapid climatic variation during the last ice age. Delta-O-18 variations observed in the core that are believed to date from the Eemian Stage have not been confirmed by other records, including the North Greenland core, and are no longer believed to represent climate events. The interglacial climate of the Eemian Stage appears to have been as stable as the Holocene.

Three different types of ice sheet core drills were used in the project, differing mainly in the depths they can drill to.

=== Hand auger ===
The hand auger weighs 80 kg, can be operated by a single person, and is useful for collecting ice cores with a diameter of 74 mm from the top 10 m of the ice cap.

=== Shallow drill ===
The shallow drill can take cores up to 50 m long and 74mm in diameter from the top 350 m of ice, and it does not require drilling fluid.

=== Deep drill ===
The deep drill works in liquid-filled holes, can retrieve the core, and can be operated at any depth. Compared to other drills, the operation is relatively slow.

== Related projects ==
In addition to GRIP, there have been several other ice core projects in Greenland, such as the Greenland Ice Sheet Project (GISP2), the North Greenland Ice Core Project (NorthGRIP), and the North Greenland Eemian Ice Drilling (NEEM).

=== Greenland Ice Sheet Project (GISP2) ===
Initially GISP2 seemed to overturn an earlier result discovered by GRIP. Based on the sharp fluctuations of the oxygen isotope ratio near the bottom of the GRIP core, it had been hypothesized that severe climate change occurred repeatedly during the last interglacial period in Greenland. However, the oxygen isotope ratio data of the GISP2 core that was excavated only 30 km away from the sampling point of the GRIP core did not match the GRIP data. It became clear that the ice layer structure was disturbed by folds at the bottom of the ice sheet in both cores, indicating that the interpretation that there was severe climate change during the final interglacial period may be incorrect.

The GISP2 reconstructions are relatively old. Recent studies have raised questions about evaluating the relationship between temperature and Delta-O-18 during the Holocene in view of the elevation changes in the ice cap at the GISP2 site. The GISP2 reconstructions changed the relationship between Delta-O-18 and temperature by a factor of two during the Holocene, while more recent reconstructions leave that relationship unchanged. Elevation change affects the Delta-O-18 record, and the older GISP2 reconstructions do not account for elevation changes.

=== NorthGRIP ===
NorthGRIP aimed to collect ice during the final interglacial period, but the bottom of the ice sheet had melted, and it was not possible to excavate those samples. As a result, temperatures estimated to be as high as 5 °C above those at present were observed from some of the ice cores that could be collected in the middle of the last interglacial period; the Greenland ice sheet apparently existed even in such a warm climate.

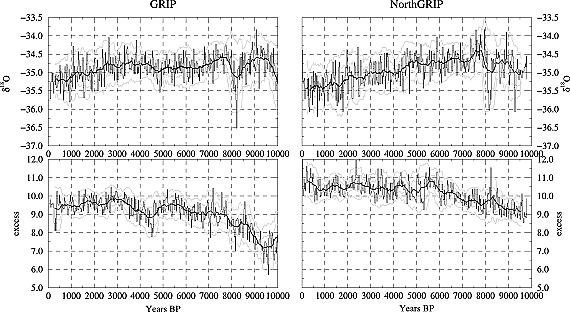
GRIP temperatures compared with NorthGRIP

The shaded lines represent the uncertainty of the estimates due to inaccuracies in the analysis and adjustments in the isotope model.

=== The North Greenland Eemian Ice Drilling (NEEM) ===
The later NEEM project extended the work of GRIP by excavating an ice core that shows the bottom melting and the folds at the NEEM site, and provides evidence concerning the entire final interglacial period. In Northern Greenland, it was warmest around 126,000 years before the beginning of the last interglacial period, when the temperature was about 8 °C ± 4 °C higher than it is now. During the 6000 years between 128,000 and 122,000 years ago, the ice sheet thickness decreased by 400 ± 250 m, and 122,000 years ago the ice sheet surface altitude was 130 ± 300 m higher than it is today. This shows that it is extremely rare for the ice sheet to melt even in the hot summer in Greenland. Rather, the ice sheet surface melted during the final interglacial period (the Eemian) because of the methane and rare gases collected from NEEM's ice core. The fact that the Greenland core remained stable during the temperature rise suggests that the Antarctic ice sheet shrank during the final interglacial period and contributed significantly to the increase in sea level.

== Climate change ==
To accurately predict the response of the Greenland ice sheet to climate change, it is necessary to obtain long-term data on past warming and its effects and improve the climate and ice sheet models based on it. Since anthropogenic factors are deeply involved in environmental issues such as greenhouse gases, they may also be related to climate change during the Eemian.

== EastGRIP ==
Previous ice core drilling projects, including GRIP, were carried out at sites where horizontal ice flow is as small as possible. In contrast, the latest EastGRIP research was conducted upstream of the Northeast Greenland Ice Stream. This is the most significant active ice stream in Greenland.

In addition, the ice depths in the earlier Greenland ice cores that corresponded to the warm period of the early Holocene were very fragile. It was almost impossible to collect highly accurate chemical and gas analysis data with high time resolution from the traditional Greenland ice cores. In view of this difficulty, EastGRIP installed a cold temperature chamber to keep the drilled ice below -30 °C immediately after the drilling, and efforts were made to minimize the destruction of ice cores by eliminating small steps of several tens of microns in the core field processing. The cold air prevents the expansion of air bubbles and keeps the ice from breaking. As a result, ice cores capable of continuous flow analysis have been acquired even from fragile depth zones, and it is expected that more detailed and accurate analysis of gas and other chemicals will be possible in the future.

== Sources ==
- Ice and Climate Group. "Field season 2015 East GReenland Ice core Project (EGRIP) 2015-2020: Moving NEEM camp to new EGRIP drilling site. and REnland ice CAp Project (RECAP) 2015" (PDF). NEEM - University of Copenhagen.
- Alley, RB, Andrews, J., Brigham-Grette, J, Clarke, GK., Cuffey, K., Fitzpatrick, J., Funder, S, Marshall, S., Miller, G., Mitrovica, J., Muhs, D., Otto-Bliesner, B., Polyak, L, & White, JW., (2010). 'History of the Greenland Ice Sheet: paleoclimatic insights', Quaternary Science Reviews, vol. 29, no. 15, pp. 1728–1756, doi:10.1016/j.quascirev.2010.02.007
- Anklin, J., Barnola, J., Beer, T., Blunier, J., Chappellaz, H., Clausen, D., … Thorsteinsson, W. (1993). Climate instability during the last interglacial period recorded in the Greenland Ice-core Project. Nature (London), 364(6434), 203–207.
- Arctic Challenge of Sustainability. (2017). 'Deep ice coring under the EGRIP in 2017'. Arctic Challenge for Sustainability Project. Retrieved from https://www.nipr.ac.jp/arcs/blog/en/2017/12/EGRIP2017-2.html
- Christ, Bierman, P. R., Schaefer, J. M., Dahl-Jensen, D., Steffensen, J. P., Corbett, L. B., Peteet, D. M., Thomas, E. K., Steig, E. J., Rittenour, T. M., Tison, J.-L., Blard, P.-H., Perdrial, N., Dethier, D. P., Lini, A., Hidy, A. J., Caffee, M. W., & Southon, J. (2021). A multimillion-year-old record of Greenland vegetation and glacial history preserved in sediment beneath 1.4 km of ice at Camp Century. Proceedings of the National Academy of Sciences - PNAS, 118(13), 1–. https://doi.org/10.1073/pnas.2021442118
- Dansgaard, W., Johnsen, S. J., Clausen, H. B., Dahljensen, D., Gundestrup, N. S., Hammer, C. U., Hvidberg, C. S., Steffensen, J. P., Sveinbjornsdottir, A. E., Jouzel, J. and Bond, G. (1993) Evidence for general instability of past climate from a 250-kyr ice-core record. Nature, 364, 218‒220.
- European Science Foundation. (2010). Greenland Icecore Project (GRIP). Retrieved from https://web.archive.org/web/20120207150245/http://www.esf.org/activities/research-networking-programmes/life-earth-and-environmental-sciences-lesc/completed-esf-research-networking-programmes-in-life-earth-and-environmental-sciences/greenland-icecore-project-grip/more-information.html
- Gerber, T. A., Hvidberg, C. S., Rasmussen, S. O., Franke, S., Sinnl, G., Grinsted, A., … Dahl-Jensen, D. (2021). Upstream flow effects revealed in the EastGRIP ice core using Monte Carlo inversion of a two-dimensional ice-flow model. The Cryosphere, 15(8), 3655–3679. https://doi.org/10.5194/tc-15-3655-2021
- Hokkaido University, (2022). 'Greenland ice sheet may halve in volume by year 3000'. Retrieved from https://www.global.hokudai.ac.jp/blog/greenland-ice-sheet-may-halve-in-volume-by-year-3000/
- T. F. Stocker, D. Qin, G.-K. Plattner, M. Tignor, S. K. Allen, J. Boschung, A. Nauels, Y. Xia, V. Bex and P. M. Midgley (ed.). IPCC (2013) Climate Change 2013: The Physical Science Basis. Contribution of Working Group I to the Fifth Assessment Report of the Intergovernmental Panel on Climate Change (Report). IPCC/Cambridge University Press, Cambridge, United Kingdom and New York, NY, USA. p. 1535.
- Johnsen S. J., Clausen, H. B., Dansgaard, W., Fuhrer, K., Gundestrup, N., Hammer, C. U., Iversen, P., Jouzel, J., Stauffer, B. and Steffensen, J. P. (1992). Irregular glacial interstadials recorded in a new Greenland ice core. Nature, 359, 311‒313.
- Masson-Delmotte, V., Landais, A., Stievenard, M., Cattani, O., Falourd, S., Jouzel, J., … Fischer, H. (2005). Holocene climatic changes in Greenland: Different deuterium excess signals at Greenland Ice Core Project (GRIP) and NorthGRIP. Journal of Geophysical Research - Atmospheres, 110(D14), D14102–n/a. https://doi.org/10.1029/2004JD005575
- NEEM community members. (2013). Eemian interglacial reconstructed from a Greenland folded ice core. Nature, 493, 489‒494.
- North Greenland Ice Core Project members. (2004). Highresolution record of Northern Hemisphere climate extending into the last interglacial period. Nature, 431, 147‒151.
- Sakurai, Iizuka, Y., Horikawa, S., Johnsen, S., Dahl-jensen, D., Steffensen, J. P., & Hondoh, T. (2009). Direct observation of salts as micro-inclusions in the Greenland GRIP ice core. Journal of Glaciology, 55(193), 777–783. https://doi.org/10.3189/002214309790152483
- SPICEcore, (n.d.). 'South Pole Ice Core'. Retrieved from https://spicecore.org/about/
- Stauffer, B. (1993). 'The Greenland Ice Core Project'. In Science, vol. 260, no. 5115, pp. 1766-1767, doi:10.1126/science.260.5115.1766
- Steffensen, J. P., Andersen, K. K., Masson-Delmotte, V., Popp, T., Rasmussen, S. O., Röthlisberger, R., ... Jouzel, J. (2008). High-Resolution Greenland Ice Core Data Show Abrupt Climate Change Happens in Few Years. Science (American Association for the Advancement of Science), 321(5889), 680–684. https://doi.org/10.1126/science.1157707
- Tandon, A. (2020). 'New climate models suggest faster melting of the Greenland Ice Sheet', Carbon Brief. Retrieved from https://www.carbonbrief.org/new-climate-models-suggest-faster-melting-of-the-greenland-ice-sheet/
- University of Copenhagen. (n.d.). 'The Central Greenland Ice Cores'. Retrieved from https://www.iceandclimate.nbi.ku.dk/research/drill_analysing/history_drilling/central_ice_cores/

== See also ==
- Camp Century – American military base in Greenland (1959–1967)
- Climatology – Scientific study of climate
- Dansgaard–Oeschger event – Rapid climate fluctuation in the last glacial period
- DYE3 – Ice core site in Greenland
- European Project for Ice Coring in Antarctica – Research project
- Greenland Ice Sheet Project – Multinational geological operation
- Ice core – Cylindrical sample drilled from an ice sheet
