= Dye 3 =

Ice core site in Greenland

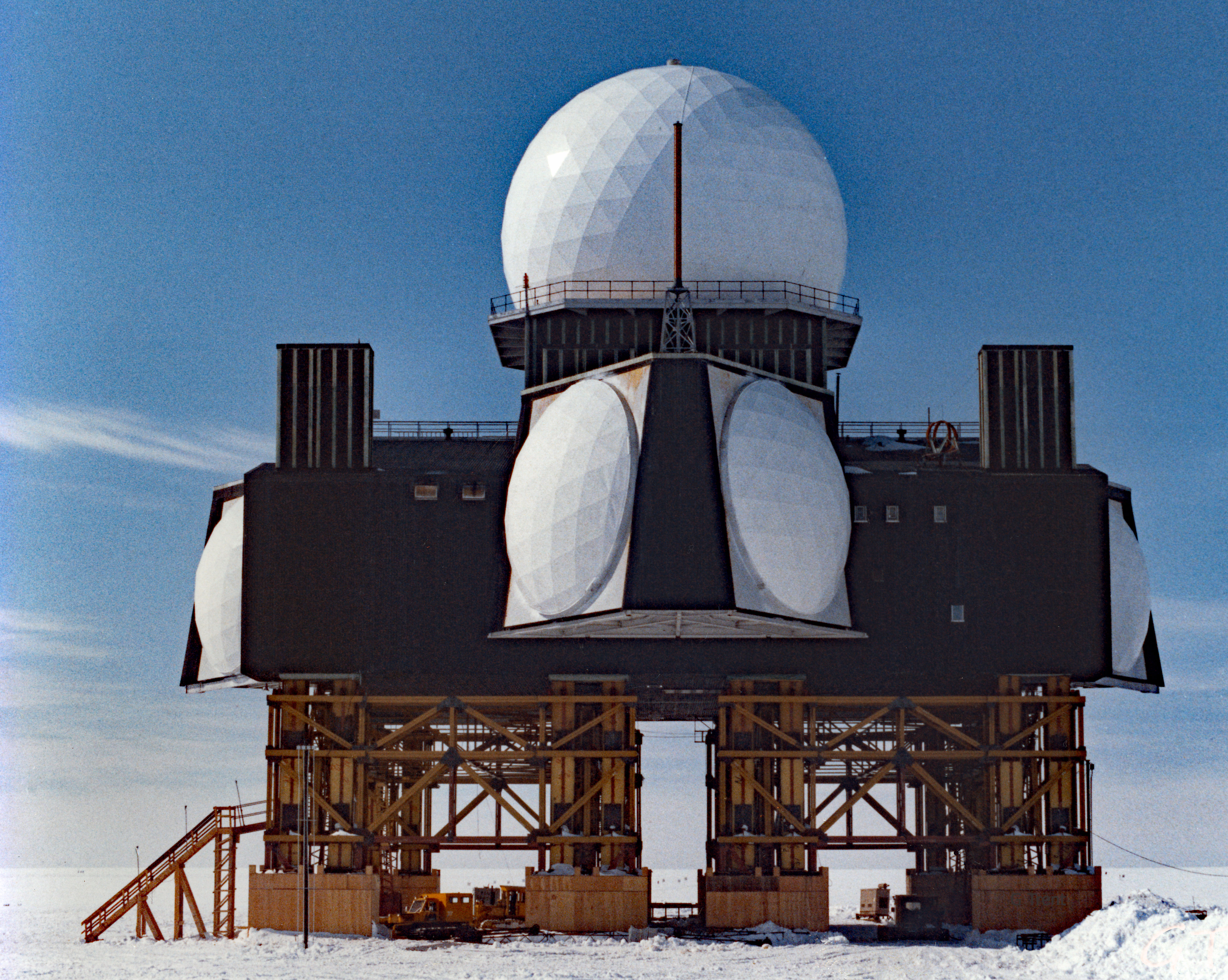
Dye 3 circa early 1980s.

Dye 3 is an ice core site and previously part of the DYE section of the Distant Early Warning (DEW) line, located at (65°11′N 43°49′W, 2480 masl) in Greenland. As a DEW line base, it was disbanded in years 1990/1991.

An ice core is a core sample from the accumulation of snow and ice that has re-crystallized and trapped air bubbles over many years. The composition of these ice cores, especially the presence of hydrogen and oxygen isotopes, provides a picture of the climate at the time. Ice cores contain an abundance of climate information.

Inclusions in the snow, such as wind-blown dust, ash, bubbles of atmospheric gas and radioactive substances, remain in the ice. The variety of climatic proxies is greater than in any other natural recorder of climate, such as tree rings or sediment layers. These include (proxies for) temperature, ocean volume, precipitation, chemistry and gas composition of the lower atmosphere, volcanic eruptions, solar variability, sea-surface productivity, desert extent and forest fires.

Typical ice cores are removed from an ice sheet such as the ice cap internal to Greenland. Greenland is, by area, the world's largest island. The Greenland ice sheet covers about 1.71 million km^{2} and contains about 2.6 million km^{3} of ice.

== Greenland ice sheet ==
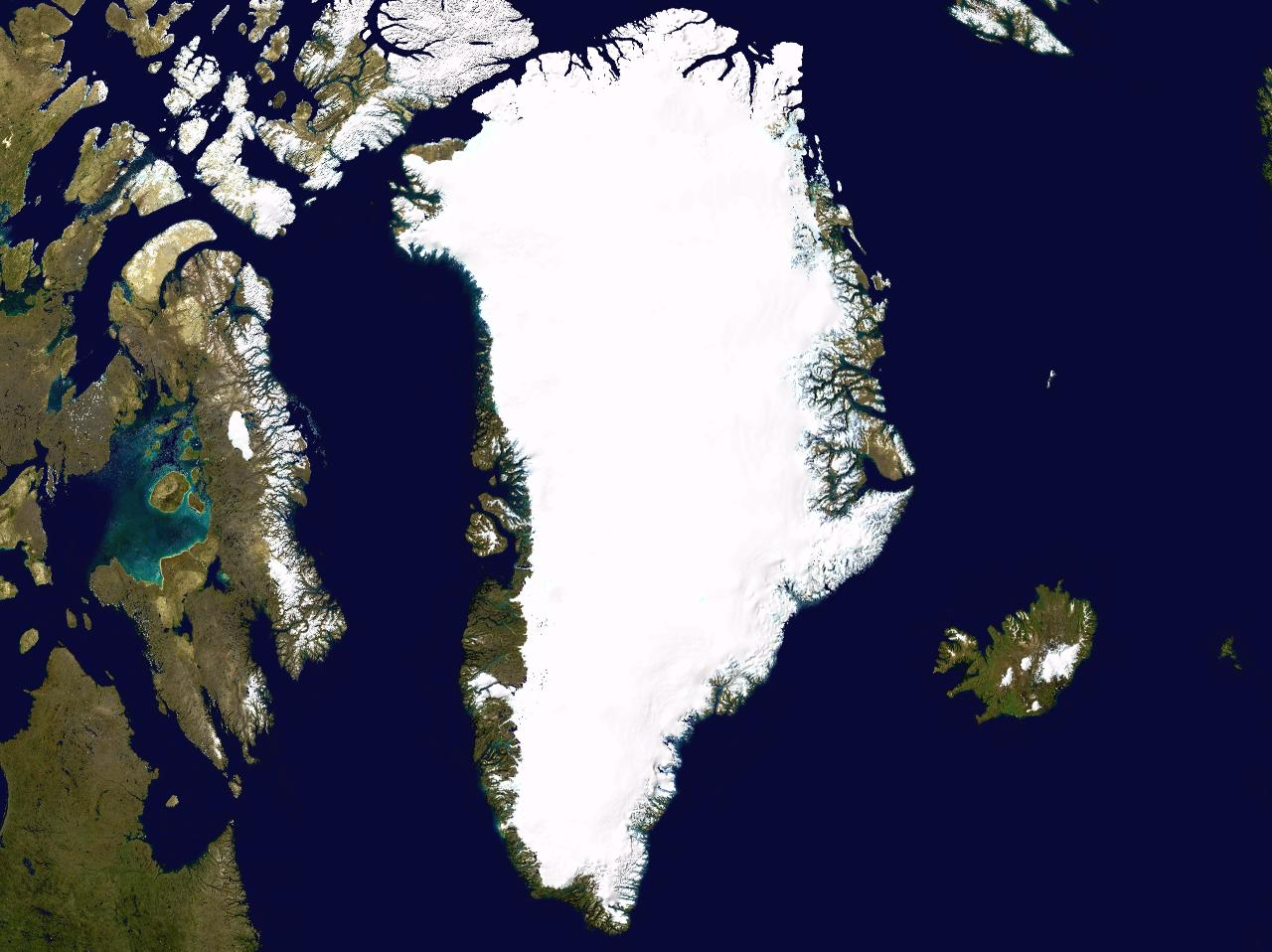
Satellite composite image of Greenland.

The 'Greenland ice sheet' (Greenlandic: Sermersuaq) is a vast body of ice covering 1.71 million km^{2}, roughly 80% of the surface of Greenland. It is the second largest ice body in the World, after the Antarctic Ice Sheet. The ice sheet is almost 2,400 kilometers long in a north–south direction, and its greatest width is 1,100 kilometers at a latitude of 77°N, near its northern margin. The mean altitude of the ice is 2,135 meters.

The ice in the current ice sheet is as old as 110,000 years. However, it is generally thought that the Greenland Ice Sheet formed in the late Pliocene or early Pleistocene by coalescence of ice caps and glaciers. It did not develop at all until the late Pliocene, but apparently developed very rapidly with the first continental glaciation.

The ice surface reaches its greatest altitude on two north–south elongated domes, or ridges. The southern dome reaches almost 3,000 metres at latitudes 63°–65°N; the northern dome reaches about 3,290 metres at about latitude 72°N. The crests of both domes are displaced east of the centre line of Greenland. The unconfined ice sheet does not reach the sea along a broad front anywhere in Greenland, so that no large ice shelves occur.

On the ice sheet, temperatures are generally substantially lower than elsewhere in Greenland. The lowest mean annual temperatures, about −31 °C (−24 °F), occur on the north-central part of the north dome, and temperatures at the crest of the south dome are about −20 °C (−4 °F).

During winter, the ice sheet takes on a strikingly clear blue/green color. During summer, the top layer of ice melts leaving pockets of air in the ice that makes it look white. Positioned in the Arctic, the Greenland ice sheet is especially vulnerable to global warming. Arctic climate is now rapidly warming.

== Distant Early Warning Line ==
Map of Distant Early Warning (DEW) Line Stations in Greenland

Dye-2 and 3 were among 58 Distant Early Warning (DEW) Line radar stations built by the United States of America (USA) between 1955 and 1960 across Alaska, Canada, Greenland and Iceland at a cost of billions of dollars.

After extensive studies in late 1957, the US Air Force (USAF) selected sites for two radar stations on the ice cap in southern Greenland. The DYE stations were the eastern extension of the DEW Line. DYE-1 was on the West Coast at Holsteinsborg; DYE-4 on the East Coast at Kulusuk. Dye 2 (66°29'30"N 46°18'19"W, 2338 masl) was built approximately 100 miles east of Sondrestrom Air Base and 90 miles south of the Arctic Circle at an altitude of 7,600 feet. Dye 3 was located approximately 100 miles south-east of Dye 2 at an elevation of 8,600 feet.

The sites were constructed with materials provided through airlift from C-130D’s from the 17th Troop Carrier Squadron at Sewart Air Force Base, flying out of Sonderstrom Air Base (now Kangerlussuaq, Greenland).

The new radar sites were found to receive from three to four feet of snow each year. The snow was formed into large drifts by winds constantly blowing as much as 100 mph. To overcome this, the Dye sites were elevated approximately 20 feet above the ice cap surface. Dye 3 was completed in 1960. Due to snow accretion, the station was "jacked up" again in the late 1970s, but by the 1990s needed further elevation.

Instead, Dye 3 was closed as a radar station in the years 1990/1991.

Today, it is used as a training site for the 139th Airlift Squadron Flying LC-130’s.

== Greenland Ice Sheet Project (GISP) ==
The Greenland Ice Sheet Project (GISP) was a decade-long project to drill 20 ice cores in Greenland. GISP involved scientists and funding agencies from Denmark, Switzerland and the United States. Besides the U.S. National Science Foundation, funding was provided by the Swiss National Science Foundation and the Danish Commission for Scientific Research in Greenland. The ice cores provide a proxy archive of temperature and atmospheric constituents that help to understand past climate variations.

Annual field expeditions were carried out to drill intermediate depth cores at various locations on the ice sheet:

- Dye 3 in 1971 to 372 m
- North Site (75°46’N 42°27’W, 2870 masl) in 1972 to 15 m
- North Central (74°37’N 39°36’W) in 1972 to 100 m
- Crête (71°7’N 37°19’W) in 1972 to 15 m
- Milcent (70°18’N 45°35’W, 2410 masl) in 1973 to 398 m
- Dye 2 (66°23’N 46°11’W) in 1973 to 50 m
- Dye 3 in 1973, an intermediate drilling to c. 390 m
- Crête in 1974 to 404.64 m
- Dye 2 in 1974 to 101 m
- Summit (71°17’N 37°56’W, 3212 masl) in 1974 to 31 m
- Dye 3 in 1975 to 95 m
- South Dome (63°33’N 44°36’W, 2850 masl) in 1975 to 80 m
- Hans Tausen (82°30’N 38°20’W, 1270 masl) in 1975 to 60 m
- Dye 3 in 1976 to 93 m
- Hans Tausen in 1976 to 50 m
- Hans Tausen in 1977 to 325 m
- Camp Century (77°10’N 61°8’W, 1885 masl) in 1977 to 49 m
- Dye 2 in 1977 to 84 m
- Camp III (69°43’N 50°8’W) in 1977 to 84 m
- Dye 3 1978 to 90 m
- Camp III in 1978 to 80 m.

“On most of the Greenland ice sheet, however, the annual accumulation rate is considerably higher than 0.2 m ice a^{−1}, and the delta method therefore works thousands of years backwards in time, the only limitation being obliteration of the annual delta cycles by diffusion of the water molecule in the solid ice....” Delta refers to the changing proportion of oxygen-18 in the different seasonal layers. “The main reason for the seasonal delta variations is that, on its travel to the polar regions, a precipitating air mass is generally cooled more in winter than in summer.” “... the annual layer thickness...decreases from 19 cm in 2,000-year-old ice to 2 cm in 10,000-year-old ice due to plastic thinning of the annual layers as they sink towards greater depths^{10}.” “... volcanic acids in snow layers deposited shortly after a large volcanic eruption can be detected – as elevated specific conductivities measured on melted ice samples8, or as elevated acidities revealed by an electric current through the solid ice...”

== Dye 3 cores ==
Although available GISP data gathered over the earlier seven years, pointed to north-central Greenland as the optimum site location for the first deep drilling, financial restrictions forced the selection of the logistically convenient Dye-3 location.

=== Dye 3 1971 ===
Preliminary GISP field work started in 1971 at Dye 3 (65°11′N 43°49′W), where a 372 meter deep, 10.2 cm diameter core was recovered using a Thermal (US) drill type. Three more cores to depths of 90, 93, and 95 m were drilled with different drill types.

=== Dye 3 1973 ===
For an intermediate drilling c. 390 m, the drill was installed 25 m below the surface at the bottom of the Dye 3 radar station. Some 740 seasonal δ^{18} cycles were counted, indicating that the core reached back to 1231 AD. Evident in this coring was that as melt water seeps through the porous snow, it refreezes somewhere in the cold firn and disturbs the layer sequence.

=== Dye 3 1975 ===
A second core at Dye 3 was drilled in 1975 with a Shallow (Swiss) drill type to 95 m at 7.6 cm diameter.

=== Dye 3 1976 ===
A third core at Dye 3 was drilled in 1976 with a Wireline (US) drill type, 10.2 cm diameter, to 93 m.

=== Dye 3 1978 ===
Another core at Dye 3 was drilled in 1978 using a Shallow (US) drill type, 10.2 cm diameter, to 90 m.

Measurements of [SO_{4}^{2−}] and [NO_{3}^{−}] in firn samples spanning the period 1895–1978 were taken from the Dye 3 1978 core down to 70 m.

=== Dye 3 1979–1981 ===
In 1979, the initial Dye-3 deep bedrock drilling was started using a 22.2 cm diameter CRREL thermal (US) coring drill to produce an 18 cm diameter access hole, which was cased, to a depth of 77 m. The large diameter casing was inserted over the porous firn zone to contain the drilling fluid.

After working out various logistical and engineering problems related to the development of a more sophisticated drilling rig, drilling to bedrock at Dye 3 began in the summer of 1979 using a new Danish electro-mechanical ice drill yielding a 10.2 cm diameter core. From July to August 1979 using ISTUK, 273 m of core was removed. At the end of the 1980 field season ISTUK had gnawed down to 901 m. In 1981 at a depth of 1785 m dust and conductivity measurements indicated the beginning of ice from the last glaciation. Coring continued and on August 10, 1981, bedrock was reached at a depth of 2038 m. The depth range for the Danish drill was 80–2038 m.

The Dye 3 site was a compromise: glaciologically, a higher site on the ice divide with smooth bedrock would have been better; logistically, such a site would have been too remote.

The borehole is 41.5 km east of the local ice divide of the south Greenland ice sheet.

=== Shear conditions ===
The Dye 3 cores were part of the GISP and, at 2037 meters, the final Dye 3 1979 core was the deepest of the 20 ice cores recovered from the Greenland ice sheet. The surface ice velocity is 12.5 ma^{−1}, 61.2° true. At 500 m above bedrock, the ice velocity is ~10 ma^{−1}, 61.2° true. The ice upstream and downstream from Dye 3 is flowing downhill (-) on ~0.48 % mean slope. The bedrock temperature is −13.22 °C (as of 1984).

=== Core continuity ===
The Dye 3 1979 core is not completely intact and is not undamaged. “Below 600 m, the ice became brittle with increasing depth and badly fractured between 800 and 1,200 m. The physical property of the core progressively improved and below ~1,400 m was of excellent quality.” “The deep ice core drilling terminated in August 1981. The ice core is 2035 m long and has a diameter of 10 cm. It was drilled with less than 6° deviation from vertical, and less than 2 m is missing. The deepest 22 m consists of silty ice with an increasing concentration of pebbles downward. In the depth interval 800 to 1400 m the ice was extremely brittle, and even careful handling unavoidably damaged this part of the core, but the rest of the core is in good to excellent condition.”

The depth interval 800 to 1400 m would be a period approximately from about two thousand years ago to about five or six thousand years ago.

Melting has been commonplace throughout the Holocene. Summer melting is usually the rule at Dye 3, and there is occasional melting even in north Greenland. All of these meltings disturb the clarity of the annual record to some degree. “An exceptionally warm spell can produce features which extend downwards by percolation, along isolated channels, into the snow of several previous years. This can happen in regions which generally have little or no melting at the snow surface as exemplified during mid July 1954 in north-west Greenland^{4}. Such an event could lead to the conclusion that two or three successive years had abnormally warm summers, whereas all the icing formed during a single period which lasted for several days. The location where melt features will have the greatest climatic significance is high in the percolation facies where summer melting is common but deep percolation is minimal^{4}. Dye 3 in southern Greenland (65°11’N; 43°50’W) is such a location.”

=== Counting annual layers ===
As the drill site of Dye 3 receives more than twice as much accumulation as central Greenland, the annual layers are well resolved and relatively thick in the upper parts, making the core ideal for dating the most recent millennia. But, the high accumulation rate has resulted in relatively rapid ice flow (flow-induced layer thinning and diffusion of isotopes), Dye 3 1979 cannot be used for annual layer counting much more than 8 kyr back in time.

=== Ice crystal diameter distribution ===
Crystal diameters range from ~0.2 cm at 1900 m from bedrock (depth 137 m) to ~0.42 cm vertical diameter (v) and ~0.55 cm horizontal diameter (h) at 300 m above bedrock (depth 1737 m). However, below 300 m crystal diameter decreases rapidly with increasing dust concentration to a minimum of ~0.05 cm at 200 m above bedrock (depth 1837 m), increasing again linearly to ~0.25 cm v and ~0.3 cm h just above bedrock. Crystal diameters remain approximately constant between 1400 and 300 m above bedrock (depths 637–1737 m), with the largest crystals and the largest distortion (~0.55 cm v and ~0.7 cm h) occurring at 1100 m above bedrock (depth 937 m).

The brittle zone mentioned above under "Core continuity" corresponds in Dye 3 1979 with the steady state grain size (crystal size) from ~637 to ~1737 m depth range. This is also the Holocene climatic optimum period.

=== Beryllium 10 variations ===
As of 1998 the only long record available for ^{10}Be is from Dye 3 1979. Questions were raised whether all parts of the Dye 3 1979 record reflect the sun activity or are affected by climatic and/or ice dynamics.

=== Dust concentration ===
The dust concentration has a peak of ~3 mg/kg at 200 m above bedrock (depth 1837 m), second only to the silty ice (>20 mg/kg) of the bottom 25 m, which has a very high deformation rate.

=== Ice ages ===
The uppermost 1780 m is considered Holocene ice, and the lower portion is considered as deposited during the Wisconsin period.

From the δ^{18} O profile of the Dye 3 core it is relatively easy to differentiate the post-glacial climatic optimum, portions thereof and earlier: the Pre-Boreal transition, the Allerød, Bølling, Younger Dryas, and Oldest Dryas. In the Dye 3 1979 oxygen isotope record, the Older Dryas appears as a downward peak establishing a small, low-intensity gap between the Bølling and the Allerød.

During the transition from the Younger Dryas to the Pre-Boreal, the South Greenland temperature increased by 15 °C in 50 years. At the beginning of this same transition the deuterium excess and dust concentration shifted to lower levels in less than 20 years.

The post-glacial climatic optimum lasted from ~9000–4000 yrs B.P. as determined from Dye 3 1979 and Camp Century 1963 δ^{18} O profiles. Both Dye 3 1979 and Camp Century 1963 cores exhibit the 8.2 ka event and the boundary event separating Holocene I from Holocene II.

=== Fossils ===
Samples from the base of the 2 km deep Dye 3 1979 and the 3 km deep GRIP cores revealed that high-altitude southern Greenland has been inhabited by a diverse array of conifer trees and insects within the past million years.

=== Dye 3 1988 ===
Ellen Mosley-Thompson led a 3-man glaciological team to drill an intermediate depth core at Dye 3, Greenland.

== Comparison with other Greenland ice cores ==
For a map of the locations of the various Greenland ice cap corings, see ref.

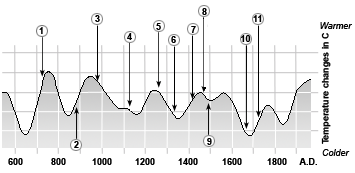
A graphical description of changes in temperature in Greenland from AD 500 – 1990 based on analysis of the deep ice core from Greenland and some historical events. The annual temperature changes are shown vertical in ˚C. The numbers are to be read horizontal: 1. From AD 700 to 750 people belonging to the Late Dorset Culture move into the area around Smith Sound, Ellesmere Island and Greenland north of Thule.; 2. Norse settlement of Iceland starts in the second half of the 9th century.; 3. Norse settlement of Greenland starts just before the year 1000.; 4. Thule Inuit move into northern Greenland in the 12th century.; 5. Late Dorset culture disappears from Greenland in the second half of the 13th century.; 6. The Western Settlement disappears in mid 14th century.; 7. In 1408 is the Marriage in Hvalsey, the last known written document on the Norse in Greenland.; 8. The Eastern Settlement disappears in mid 15th century.; 9. John Cabot is the first European in the post-Iceland era to visit Labrador – Newfoundland in 1497.; 10. “Little Ice Age” from ca 1600 to mid 18th century.; 11. The Norwegian priest, Hans Egede, arrives in Greenland in 1721.

To investigate the possibility of climatic cooling, scientists drilled into the Greenland ice caps to obtain core samples. The oxygen isotopes from the ice caps suggested that the Medieval Warm Period had caused a relatively milder climate in Greenland, lasting from roughly 800 to 1200. However, from 1300 or so the climate began to cool. By 1420, we know that the "Little Ice Age" had reached intense levels in Greenland.

For most of the arctic ice cores up to 1987, regions of the core with high dust concentrations correlate well with the ice having high deformation rates and small crystal diameters, in both Holocene and Wisconsin ice.

=== Camp Century 1963 ===
The Camp Century, Greenland, ice core (cored from 1963 to 1966) is 1390 m deep and contains climatic oscillations with periods of 120, 940, and 13,000 years.

==== Counting annual layers ====
“Thus in principle dating of the Camp Century ice core by counting annual layers is possible to about the 1,060 m depth, corresponding to 8,300 yr BP according to the time scale which we shall adopt.” “It may be necessary, however, to apply a depth dependent correction to account for ‘lost’ annual oscillations. Even during firnification seasonal δ-oscillations in years with unusually low accumulation may disappear due to mass exchange. Unfortunately, the physical condition (broken or missing pieces) of the Camp Century ice core precludes continuous measurement of seasonal isotope variations for the purpose of dating from the surface downward.”

=== Crête 1972 ===
The Crête core was drilled in central Greenland (1974) and reached a depth of 404.64 meters, extending back only about fifteen centuries.

=== Milcent 1973 ===
"The first core drilled at Station Milcent in central Greenland covers the past 780 years." Milcent core was drilled at 70.3°N, 44.6°W, 2410 masl. The Milcent core (398 m) was 12.4 cm in diameter, using a Thermal (US) drill type, in 1973.

==== Ice ages ====
The Milcent core record only goes back to AD 1174 (Holocene) due to the high accumulation rates.

=== Renland 1985 ===
The Renland ice core was drilled in 1985. The Renland ice core from East Greenland apparently covers a full glacial cycle from the Holocene into the previous Eemian interglacial. The Renland ice core is 325 m long.

From the delta-profile, the Renland ice cap in the Scoresbysund Fiord has always been separated from the inland ice, yet all the delta-leaps revealed in the Camp Century 1963 core recurred in the Renland ice core.

==== Inclusions in the ice ====
The Renland core is noted for apparently containing the first Northern Hemisphere record of methanesulfonate (MSA), and having the first continuous record of non-seasalt sulfate.

The Renland core is also the first to provide a continuous record of ammonium (NH_{4}^{+}) apparently through the whole glacial period.

The distribution of ^{10}Be in the top 40 m of the Renland ice core has been reported and corroborates the ^{10}Be cyclic fluctuation pattern from Dye 3.

==== Ice ages ====
The Renland core apparently contains ice from the Eemian onward.

=== GRIP 1989 ===
GRIP successfully drilled a 3028-metre ice core to the bed of the Greenland Ice Sheet at Summit, Central Greenland from 1989 to 1992 at 72°35′N 37°38′W, 3238 masl.

==== Inclusions in the ice ====
Eight ash layers have been identified in the central Greenland ice core GRIP. Four of the ash layers (Ash Zones I and II, Saksunarvatn and the Settlement layer) originating in Iceland have been identified in GRIP by comparison of chemical composition of glass shards from the ash. The other four have not been correlated with known ash deposits.

The Saksunarvatn tephra via radiocarbon dating is ca 10,200 years BP.

=== GISP2 1989 ===
The follow-up U.S. GISP2 project drilled at a glaciologically better location on the summit (72°36'N, 38°30'W, 3200 masl). This hit bedrock (and drilled another 1.55 m into bedrock) on July 1, 1993 after five years of drilling. European scientists produced a parallel core in the GRIP project. GISP2 produced an ice core 3053.44 meters in depth, the deepest ice core recovered in the world at the time. The GRIP site was 30 km to the east of GISP2. "Down to a depth of 2790 m in GISP2 (corresponding to an age of about 110 kyr B.P.), the GISP2 and GRIP records are nearly identical in shape and in many of the details."

==== Visual stratigraphy ====
The GISP2 time scale is based on counting annual layers primarily by visual stratigraphy.

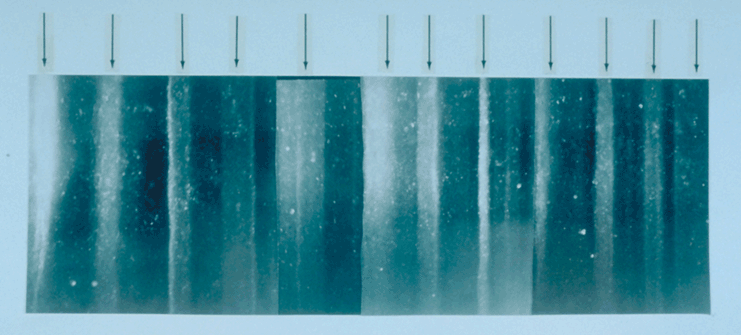
19 cm long section of GISP 2 ice core from 1855 m showing annual layer structure illuminated from below by a fiber optic source. Section contains 11 annual layers with summer layers (arrowed) sandwiched between darker winter layers.

The isotopic temperature records show 23 interstadial events correlateable between the GRIP and GISP2 records between 110 and 15 kyr B.P. Ice in both cores below 2790 m depth (records prior to 110 kyr B.P.) shows evidence of folding or tilting in structures too large to be fully observed in a single core.

The bulk of the GISP2 ice core is archived at the National Ice Core Laboratory in Lakewood, Colorado, United States.

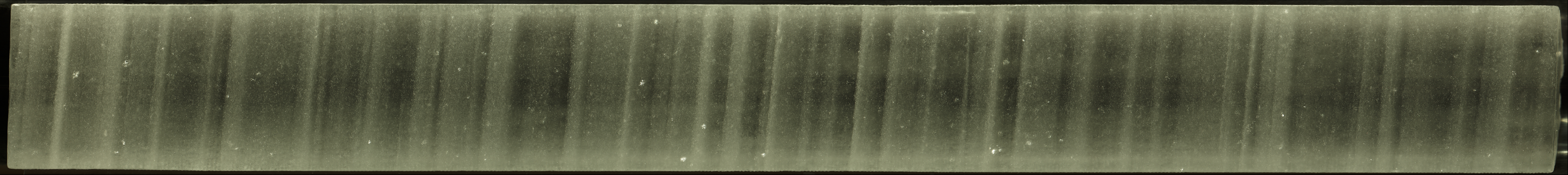
Photograph of a section of the GISP2 ice core from 1837 m depth with clearly visible annual layers. The white bands are considered from summer snow and the clear bands from winter snow.

=== North Greenland Ice Core Project 1996 ===
The drilling site of the North Greenland Ice Core Project (NGRIP) is near the center of Greenland (75.1 N, 42.32 W, 2917 m, ice thickness 3085). Drilling began in 1999 and was completed at bedrock in on July 17, 2003. The NGRIP site was chosen to extract a long and undisturbed record stretching into the last glacial, and it was apparently successful.

Unusually, there is melting at the bottom of the NGRIP core – believed to be due to a high geothermal heat flux locally. This has the advantage that the bottom layers are less compressed by thinning than they would otherwise be: NGRIP annual layers at 105 kyr age are 1.1 cm thick, twice the GRIP thicknesses at equal age.

==== Shear conditions ====
The site was chosen for a flat basal topography to avoid the flow distortions that render the bottom of the GRIP and GISP cores unreliable.

==== Ice crystal diameter distribution ====
In the upper 80 m of the ice sheet, the firn or the snow gradually compacts to a close packing of ice crystals of typical sizes 1 to 5 mm. Crystal size distributions were obtained from fifteen vertical thin sections of 20 cm × 10 cm (height × width) and a thickness of 0.4 ±0.1 mm of ice evenly distributed in the depth interval 115 – 880 m. Peak sizes with depth were ~1.9 mm 115 m, ~2.2 mm 165 m, ~2.8 mm 220 m, ~3.0 mm 330 m, ~3.2 mm 440 m, ~3.3 mm 605 m, whereas mean sizes with depth were ~1.8 115 m, ~2.2 mm 165 m, ~2.4 mm 220 m, ~2.8 mm ~270 m, ~2.75 mm 330 m, ~2.6 mm ~370 m, ~2.9 mm 440 m, ~2.8 mm ~490 m, ~2.9 mm ~540 m, ~2.9 mm 605 m, ~3.0 ~660 m, ~3.2 mm ~720 m, ~2.9 mm ~770 m, ~2.7 mm ~820 m, ~2.8 mm 880 m. And, here again as with Dye 3, steady state in grain growth was reached and continued through the post-glacial climatic optimum.

The size distribution of ice crystals changes with depth and approaches the Normal Grain Growth law via competing mechanisms of fragmentation (producing smaller polygonal grains) and grain boundary diffusion (producing larger, vertically compressed, horizontally expanded grains). Although some of the peaks for the deeper distributions appear to be slightly greater, the predicted steady state average grain size is 2.9±0.1 mm.

==== Ice ages ====
The NGRIP record helps to resolve a problem with the GRIP record – the unreliability of the Eemian Stage portion of the record. NGRIP covers 5 kyr of the Eemian, and shows that temperatures then were roughly as stable as the pre-industrial Holocene temperatures were. This is confirmed by sediment cores, in particular MD95-2042.

==== Fossils ====
In 2003, NGRIP recovered what seem to be plant remnants nearly two miles below the surface, and they may be several million years old.

"Several of the pieces look very much like blades of grass or pine needles," said University of Colorado at Boulder geological sciences Professor James White, an NGRIP principal investigator. "If confirmed, this will be the first organic material ever recovered from a deep ice-core drilling project," he said.

== See also ==
- List of research stations in the Arctic
