= Greenland Ice Sheet Project =

Multinational geological operation

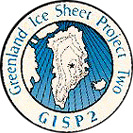
GISP2 logo

The Greenland Ice Sheet Project (GISP) was a decade-long project to drill ice cores in Greenland that involved scientists and funding agencies from Denmark, Switzerland and the United States. Besides the U.S. National Science Foundation (NSF), funding was provided by the Swiss National Science Foundation and the Danish Commission for Scientific Research in Greenland. The ice cores provide a proxy archive of temperature and atmospheric constituents that help to understand past climate variations.

The preliminary GISP field work started in 1971 at Dye 3 (65°N 43°W), where a 372 meter deep, 10.2 cm diameter core was recovered. After this, annual field expeditions were carried out to drill intermediate depth cores at various locations on the ice sheet. The first was a 398 m core at Milcent and another was a 405 m core at the Crete station in 1974. After working out various logistical and engineering problems related to the development of a more sophisticated drilling rig, drilling to bedrock at Dye 3 began in the summer of 1979 using a new Danish electro-mechanical ice drill. In the first year, an 18 cm diameter hole was drilled and cased to a depth of 80 m. Coring continued for two more seasons, and on August 10, 1981, bedrock was reached at a depth of 2037 m. The Dye 3 site was a compromise: glaciologically, a higher site on the ice divide with smooth bedrock would have been better; logistically, such a site would have been too remote.

== GISP drilling operations ==
GISP drilling operations
Year	Location	Coordinates	Type of drill	Core diam. (cm)	Depth (m)	Notes
1971	Dye 3	65°11′N 43°49′W	Thermal	10.2	372	CRREL thermal drill.
1972	North Site	75°46′N 42°27′W	SIPRE	7.6	15	
1972	Crete	71°07′N 37°19′W	SIPRE	7.6	15	
1973	Milcent	70°18′N 45°35′W	Thermal	12.4	398	CRREL thermal drill.
1973	Dye 2	66°23′N 46°11′W	Shallow	7.6	50	
1974	Crete	71°07′N 37°19′W	Thermal	12.4	405	CRREL thermal drill.
1974	Dye 2	66°23′N 46°11′W	Shallow	10.2	101	
1974	Summit	71°17′N 37°56′W	Shallow	7.6	31	
1975	Dye 3	65°11′N 43°49′W	Shallow	7.6	95	
1975	South Dome	63°33′N 44°36′W	Shallow	7.6	80	
1975	Hans Tausen	82°30′N 38°20′W	Shallow	7.6	60	
1976	Dye 3	65°11′N 43°49′W	Wireline	10.0	93	CRREL wireline drill; test hole prior to sending the drill to the Ross Ice Shelf.
1976	Hans Tausen	82°30′N 38°20′W	Shallow	7.6	50	
1977	Camp Century	77°10′N 61°08′W	Shallow	7.6	100	
1977	Dye 2	66°23′N 46°11′W	Shallow	7.6	84	
1977	North Central	74°37′N 39°36′W	Shallow	7.6	100	
1977	Camp III	69°43′N 50°08′W	Shallow	7.6	49	
1978	Dye 3	65°11′N 43°49′W	Shallow	10.2	90	
1978	Camp III	69°43′N 50°08′W	Shallow	7.6	80	
1979-1981	Dye 3	65°11′N 43°49′W	Thermal & electromechanical	10.2	2037	CRREL thermal drill to 80 m to install casing; Danish ISTUK EM drill from 80 m to bedrock.

== GISP2 ==
There was a follow-up U.S. GISP2 project, which drilled at a glaciologically better location on the summit of the ice sheet. This hit bedrock (and drilled another 1.55 m into bedrock) on July 1, 1993 after five years of drilling, while European scientists produced a parallel core in the GRIP project. GISP2 produced an ice core 3053.44 meters in depth, the deepest ice core recovered in the world at the time.

The location of the GISP2 drilling was revisited annually during summer campaigns to investigate the post-depositional properties of gasses and aerosols in the firn. Eventually, GISP2 and Summit Camp became the site of a year-round NSF / NOAA climate observatory and research facility known as the Greenland Environmental Observatory or GEOSummit.

The bulk of the GISP2 ice core is archived at the National Ice Core Laboratory in Lakewood, Colorado, United States.

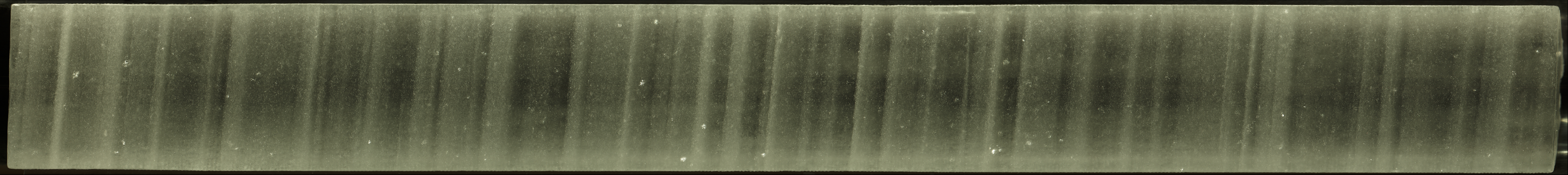
Photograph of a section of the GISP2 ice core from 1837 m depth with clearly visible annual layers.

== See also ==
- Clair Patterson
- Dye 3
- European Project for Ice Coring in Antarctica (EPICA)
- North Greenland Ice Core Project (NGRIP)

== Sources ==
- Langway, Chester C.; Oeschger, H.; Dansgaard, W. (1985). "The Greenland Ice Sheet Program in Perspective". In Langway, Chester C.; Oeschger, H.; Dansgaard, W. (eds.). Greenland Ice Core: Geophysics, geochemistry, and the environment. Washington D.C.: American Geophysical Union. pp. 1–8. ISBN 0875900577.
- Langway, Chester C. (January 2008). "The history of early polar ice cores" (PDF). CRREL Report (TR-08-1): 1–47. Archived from the original (PDF) on 2016-11-18.
- Talalay, Pavel G. (2016). Mechanical Ice Drilling Technology. Beijing: Springer. ISBN 978-7-116-09172-6.
