= Heinrich event =

Large groups of icebergs traversing the North Atlantic

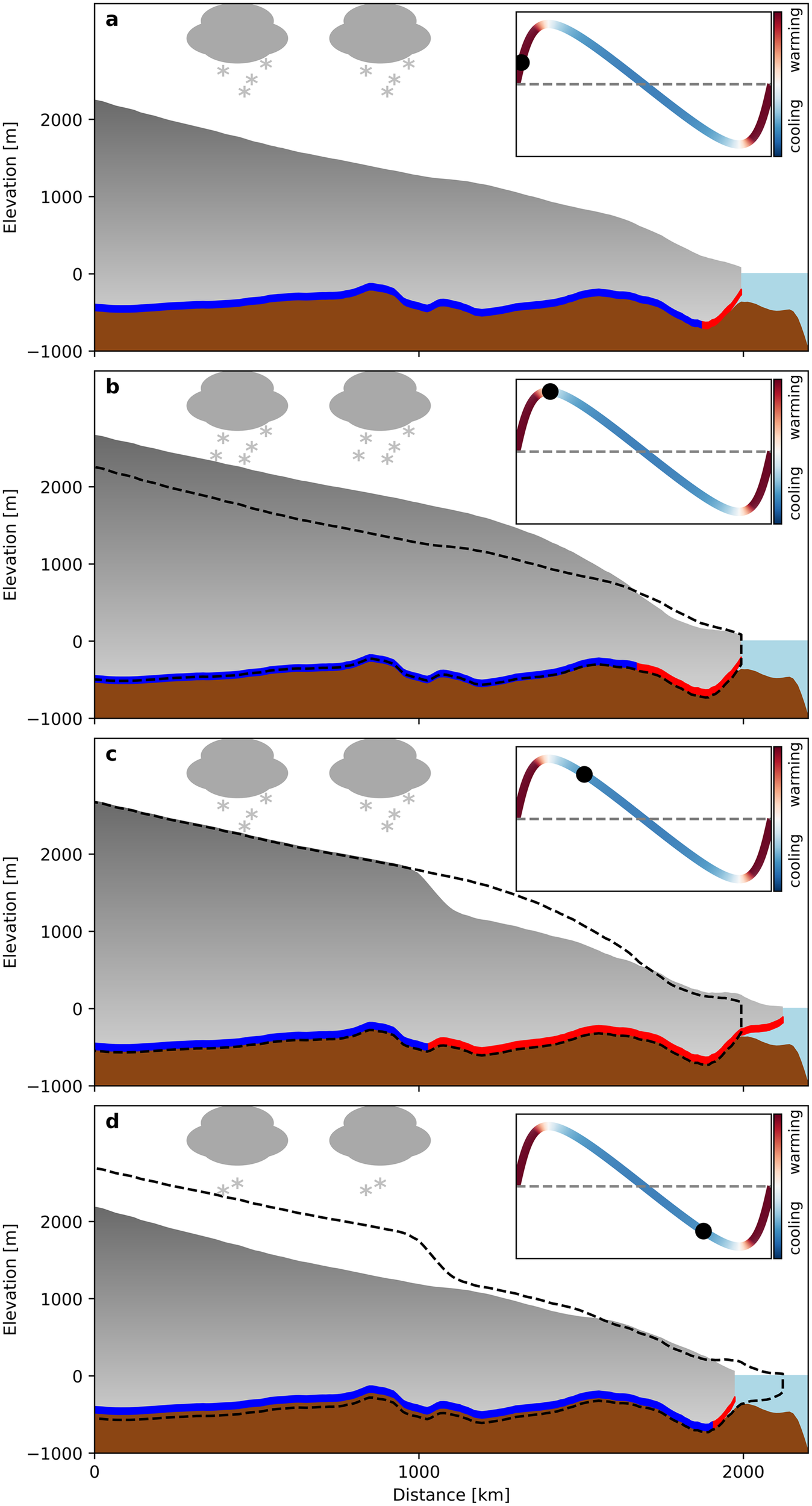
A reconstruction of how Heinrich events would have likely proceeded, with the Laurentide ice sheet first growing to an unsustainable position, where the base of its periphery becomes too warm, and then rapidly losing ice until it is reduced to sustainable size

A Heinrich event is a natural phenomenon in which large groups of icebergs break off from the Laurentide ice sheet and traverse the Hudson Strait into the North Atlantic. First described by the marine geologist Hartmut Heinrich, they occurred during five of the last seven glacial periods over the past 640,000 years. Heinrich events are particularly well documented for the Wisconsin glaciation, during the Last Glacial Period, but notably absent from the Penultimate Glacial Period. The icebergs contained rock mass that had been eroded by the glaciers, and as they melted, the material was dropped to the sea floor as ice rafted debris and formed deposits called Heinrich layers.

The icebergs' melting caused vast quantities of fresh water to be added to the North Atlantic. Such inputs of cold and fresh water may well have altered the density-driven, thermohaline circulation patterns of the ocean, and often coincide with indications of global climate fluctuations.

Various mechanisms have been proposed to explain Heinrich events, most of which imply instability of the massive Laurentide Ice Sheet, a continental ice sheet covering most of northeastern North America during the Last Glacial Period. Other Northern Hemisphere ice sheets were potentially involved as well, such as the Fennoscandic and Iceland/Greenland. However, the initial cause of the instability is still debated.

== Description ==
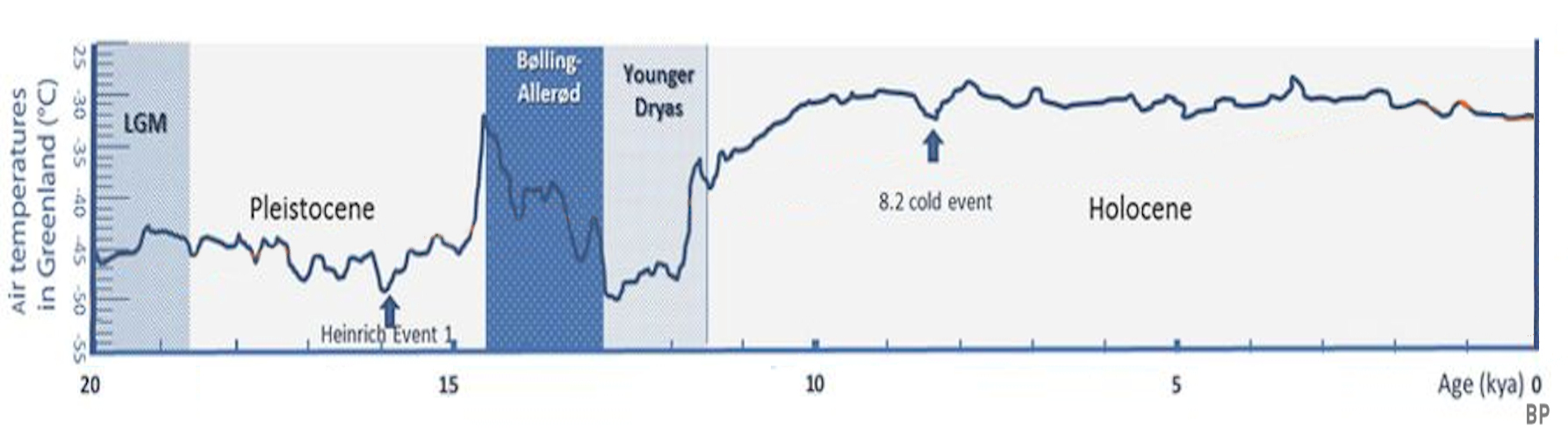
The H1 Heinrich event occurred in the Pleistocene, around 16,000 years ago. Evolution of temperature in the Post-Glacial period since the Last Glacial Period, according to the Greenland ice cores.

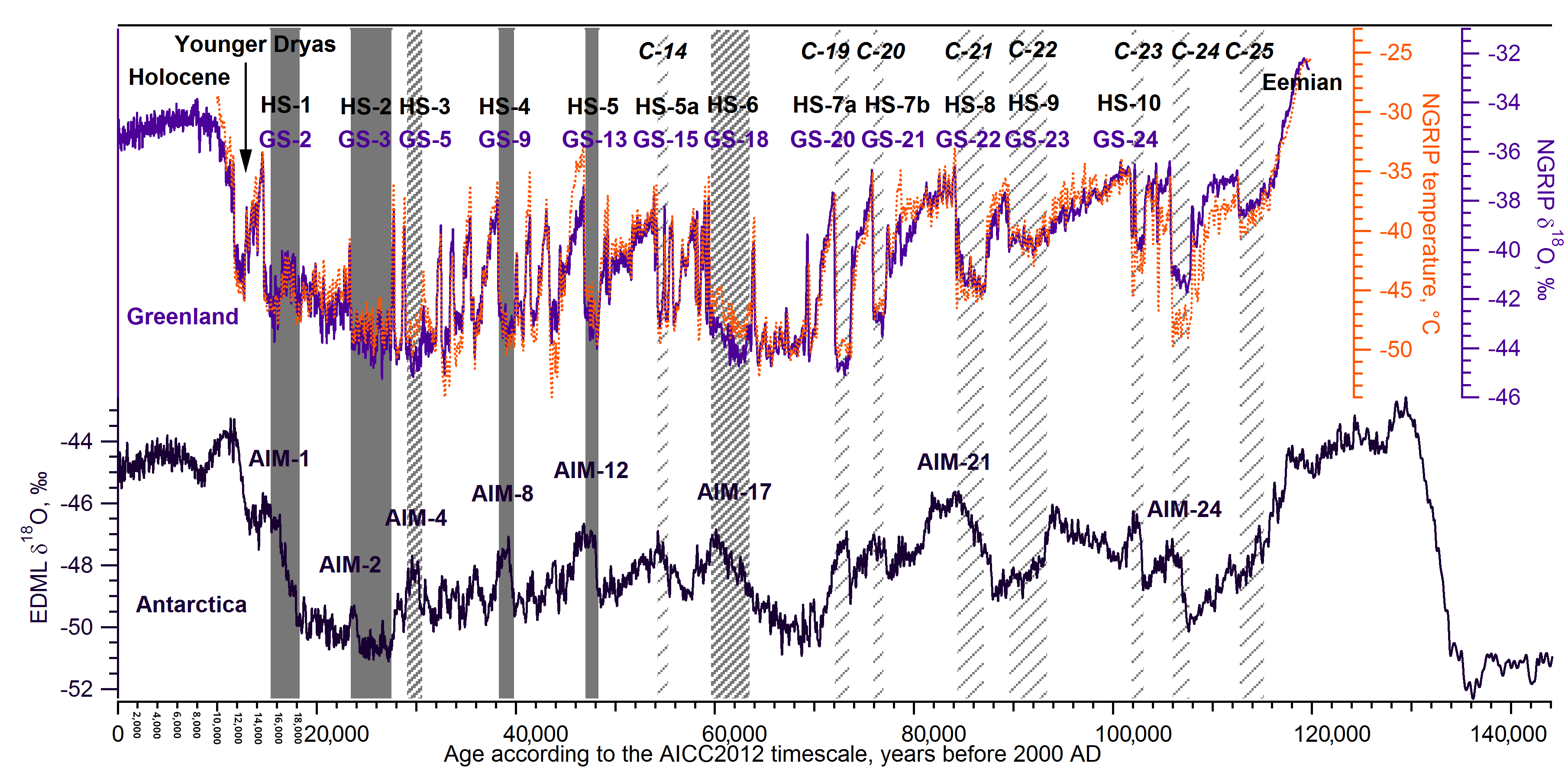
Chronology of climatic events of importance for the Last Glacial Period (~last 120,000 years), as recorded in polar ice cores, and approximate relative position of Heinrich events, initially recorded in marine sediment cores from the North Atlantic. Light violet line: δ^{18}O from the NGRIP ice core (Greenland), permil (NGRIP members, 2004). Orange dots: temperature reconstruction for the NGRIP drilling site (Kindler et al., 2014). Dark violet line: δ^{18}O from the EDML ice core (Antarctica), permil (EPICA community members, 2006). Grey areas: major Heinrich events of mostly Laurentide origine (H1, H2, H4, H5). Grey hatch: major Heinrich events of mostly European origine (H3, H6). Light grey hatch and numbers C-14 to C-25: minor IRD layers registered in North Atlantic marine sediment cores (Chapman et al., 1999). HS-1 to HS-10: Heinrich Stadial (HS, Heinrich, 1988; Rasmussen et al., 2003; Rashid et al., 2003). GS-2 to GS-24: Greenland Stadial (GS, Rasmussen et al., 2014). AIM-1 to AIM-24: Antarctic Isotope Maximum (AIM, EPICA community members, 2006). Antarctica and Greenland ice core records are shown on their common timescale AICC2012 (Bazin et al., 2013; Veres et al., 2013).

The strict definition of a Heinrich event is the climatic event causing the ice rafted debris (IRD) layer observed in marine sediment cores from the North Atlantic: a massive collapse of Northern Hemisphere ice shelves and the consequent release of a prodigious volume of icebergs. By extension, the name can refer also to the associated climatic anomalies registered at other places around the globe at approximately the same time periods. The events are rapid and last probably less than a millennium, a duration varying from one event to the next, and their abrupt onset may occur in mere years. Heinrich events are clearly observed in many North Atlantic marine sediment cores covering the Last Glacial Period; the lower resolution of the sedimentary record before then makes it more difficult to deduce whether they occurred during other glacial periods in the Earth's history. Some researchers identify the Younger Dryas event as a Heinrich event, which would make it event H0 (table, right).

Heinrich events appear related to some but not all of the cold periods preceding the rapid warming events known as Dansgaard–Oeschger events, which are best recorded in the North Greenland Ice Core Project. However, difficulties in synchronising marine sediment cores and Greenland ice cores to the same time scale have raised questions as to the accuracy of that statement.

== Potential climatic fingerprint of Heinrich events ==
Heinrich's original observations were of six layers in ocean sediment cores with extremely high proportions of rocks of continental origin, "lithic fragments", in the 180 μm to 3 mm (1/8 in) size range. The larger-size fractions cannot be transported by ocean currents and are thus interpreted as having been carried by icebergs or sea ice that broke off glaciers or ice shelves and dumped debris onto the sea floor as the icebergs melted. Geochemical analyses of the IRD can provide information about the origin of these debris: mostly the large Laurentide Ice Sheet, which covered North America for Heinrich events 1, 2, 4 and 5 and, on the contrary, European ice sheets for the minor events 3 and 6. The signature of the events in sediment cores varies considerably with distance from the source region.

For events of Laurentide origin, there is a belt of IRD at around 50° N, known as the Ruddiman belt, expanding some 3,000 km (1,900 mi) from its North American source towards Europe, and thinning by an order of magnitude from the Labrador Sea to the European end of the present iceberg route (Grousset et al., 1993). During Heinrich events, huge volumes of fresh water flow into the ocean. For Heinrich event 4, based on a model study reproducing the isotopic anomaly of oceanic oxygen-18, the fresh water flux has been estimated to 0.29±0.05 Sverdrup with a duration of 250±150 years, equivalent to a fresh water volume of about 2.3 million cubic kilometres (0.55 million cubic miles), or a 2 ± 1 m (6 ft 7 in ± 3 ft 3 in) sea-level rise.

Several geological indicators fluctuate approximately in time with those Heinrich events, but difficulties in precise dating and correlation make it difficult to tell whether the indicators precede or lag Heinrich events or, in some cases, whether they are related at all. Heinrich events are often marked by the following changes:

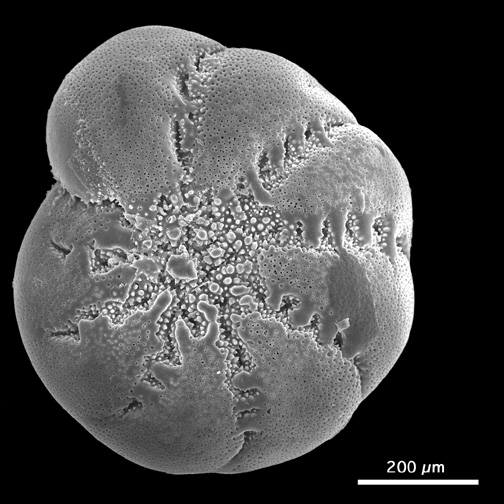
As well as indicating oceanic productivity, foraminifera tests also provide valuable isotopic data

- Increased δ^{18}O of the northern (Nordic) seas and East Asian stalactites (speleothems), which by proxy suggests a falling global temperature (or a rising ice volume)
- Decreased oceanic salinity from the influx of fresh water
- Decreased sea surface temperature estimates off the West African coast through biochemical indicators known as alkenones (Sachs 2005)
- Warming of the subsurface ocean in the subpolar North Atlantic
- Changes in sedimentary disturbance (bioturbation) caused by burrowing animals
- Flux in planktonic isotopic make-up (changes in δ^{13}C, decreased δ^{18}O)
- Pollen indications of cold-loving pines replacing oaks on the North American mainland (Grimm et al. 1993)
- Decreased foraminiferal abundance, which the pristine nature of many samples does not allow to be attributed to preservational bias and has been related to reduced salinity
- Increased terrigenous runoff from the continents, measured near the mouth of the Amazon River
- Increased grain size in wind-blown loess in China, suggesting stronger winds
- Changes in relative thorium-230 abundance, reflecting variations in ocean current velocity
- Increased deposition rates in the northern Atlantic, reflected by an increase in continentally derived sediments (lithics) relative to background sedimentation
- Expansion of grass and shrubland across large areas of Europe

The global extent of those records illustrates the dramatic impact of Heinrich events.

== Unusual Heinrich events ==
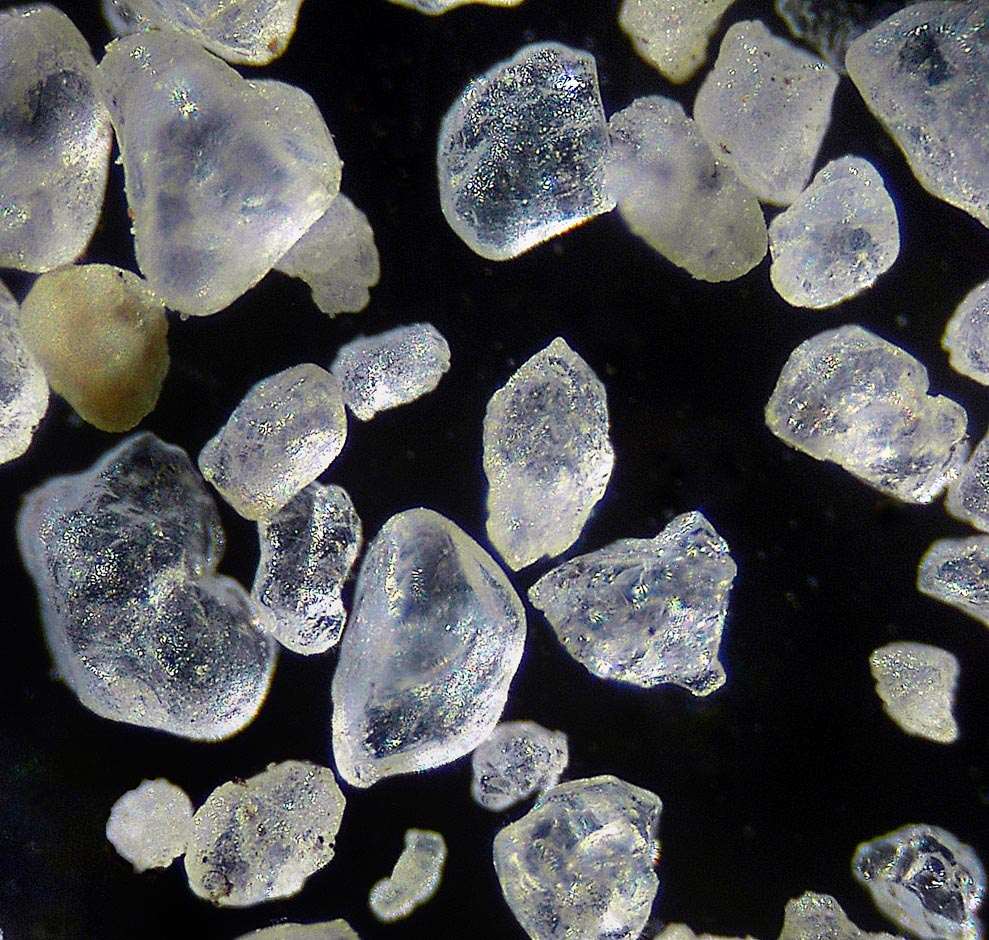
The lithic proportion of sediments deposited during H3 and H6 is substantially below that of other Heinrich events.

H3 and H6 do not share such a convincing suite of Heinrich event symptoms as events H1, H2, H4, and H5, which has led some researchers to suggest that they are not true Heinrich events. That would make Gerard C. Bond's suggestion of Heinrich events fitting into a 7,000-year cycle ("Bond events") suspect.

Several lines of evidence suggest that H3 and H6 were somehow different from the other events.

- Lithic peaks: a far smaller proportion of lithics (3,000 vs. 6,000 grains per gram) is observed in H3 and H6, which means that the role of the continents in providing sediments to the oceans was relatively lower.
- Foram dissolution: foraminifera tests appear to be more eroded during H3 and H6 (Gwiazda et al., 1996). That may indicate an influx of nutrient-rich, hence corrosive, Antarctic bottom water by a reconfiguration of oceanic circulation patterns.
- Ice provenance: Icebergs in H1, H2, H4, and H5 are relatively enriched in Paleozoic "detrital carbonate" originating from the Hudson Strait region, but icebergs in H3 and H6 carried less of that distinctive material
- Ice rafted debris distribution: sediment transported by ice does not extend as far east during H3 and H6, and some researchers have suggested a European origin for at least some H3 and H6 clasts. America and Europe were originally adjacent to each other, so the rocks on each continent are difficult to distinguish, and the source is open to interpretation.

== Causes ==
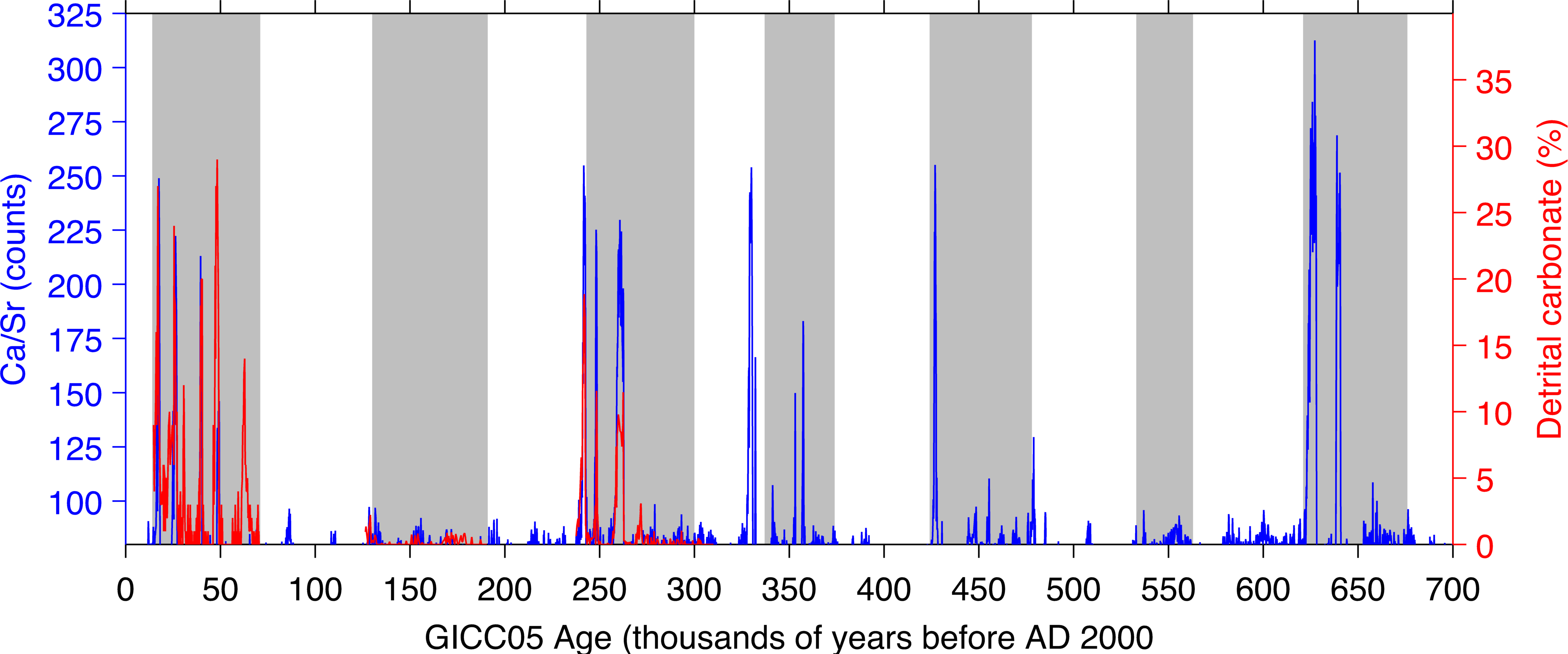
The ratio of calcium versus strontium in a North Atlantic drill core (blue; Hodell et al., 2008) compared to petrologic counts of "detrital carbonate" (Bond et al., 1999; Obrochta et al., 2012; Obrochta et al., 2014), the mineralogically distinctive component of Hudson Strait-derived IRD. Shading indicates glaciations ("ice ages").

As with so many climate related issues, the system is far too complex to be confidently assigned to a single cause. There are several possible drivers, which fall into two categories.

=== Internal forcings—the "binge–purge" model ===
This model suggests that factors internal to ice sheets cause the periodic disintegration of major ice volumes that are responsible for Heinrich events.

The gradual accumulation of ice on the Laurentide Ice Sheet led to a gradual increase in its mass, as the "binge phase". Once the sheet reached a critical mass, the soft, unconsolidated sub-glacial sediment formed a "slippery lubricant" over which the ice sheet slid, in the "purge phase", lasting around 750 years. The original model proposed that geothermal heat caused the subglacial sediment to thaw once the ice volume was large enough to prevent the escape of heat into the atmosphere.

The mathematics of the system are consistent with a 7,000-year periodicity, similar to that observed if H3 and H6 are indeed Heinrich events. However, if H3 and H6 are not Heinrich events, the binge-purge model loses credibility, as the predicted periodicity is key to its assumptions.

It may appear suspect also that similar events are not observed in other ice ages, although this may be due to the lack of high-resolution sediments.

In addition, the model predicts that the reduced size of ice sheets during the Pleistocene should reduce the size, impact, and frequency of Heinrich events, which is not reflected by the evidence.

=== External forcings ===
Several factors external to ice sheets may cause Heinrich events, but such factors would have to be large to overcome attenuation by the huge volumes of ice involved.

Gerard C. Bond suggests that changes in the flux of solar energy on a 1,500-year scale may be correlated to the Dansgaard-Oeschger cycles and in turn the Heinrich events, but the small magnitude of the change in energy makes such an extraterrestrial factor unlikely to have the required large effects, at least without huge positive feedback processes acting within the Earth system. However, rather than the warming itself melting the ice, sea-level change associated with the warming destabilised ice shelves. A rise in sea level could begin to corrode the bottom of an ice sheet, undercutting it; when one ice sheet failed and surged, the ice released would further raise sea levels, and further destabilizing other ice sheets. In favour of this theory is the non-simultaneity of ice sheet break-up in H1, H2, H4, and H5, where European breakup preceded European melting by up to 1,500 years.

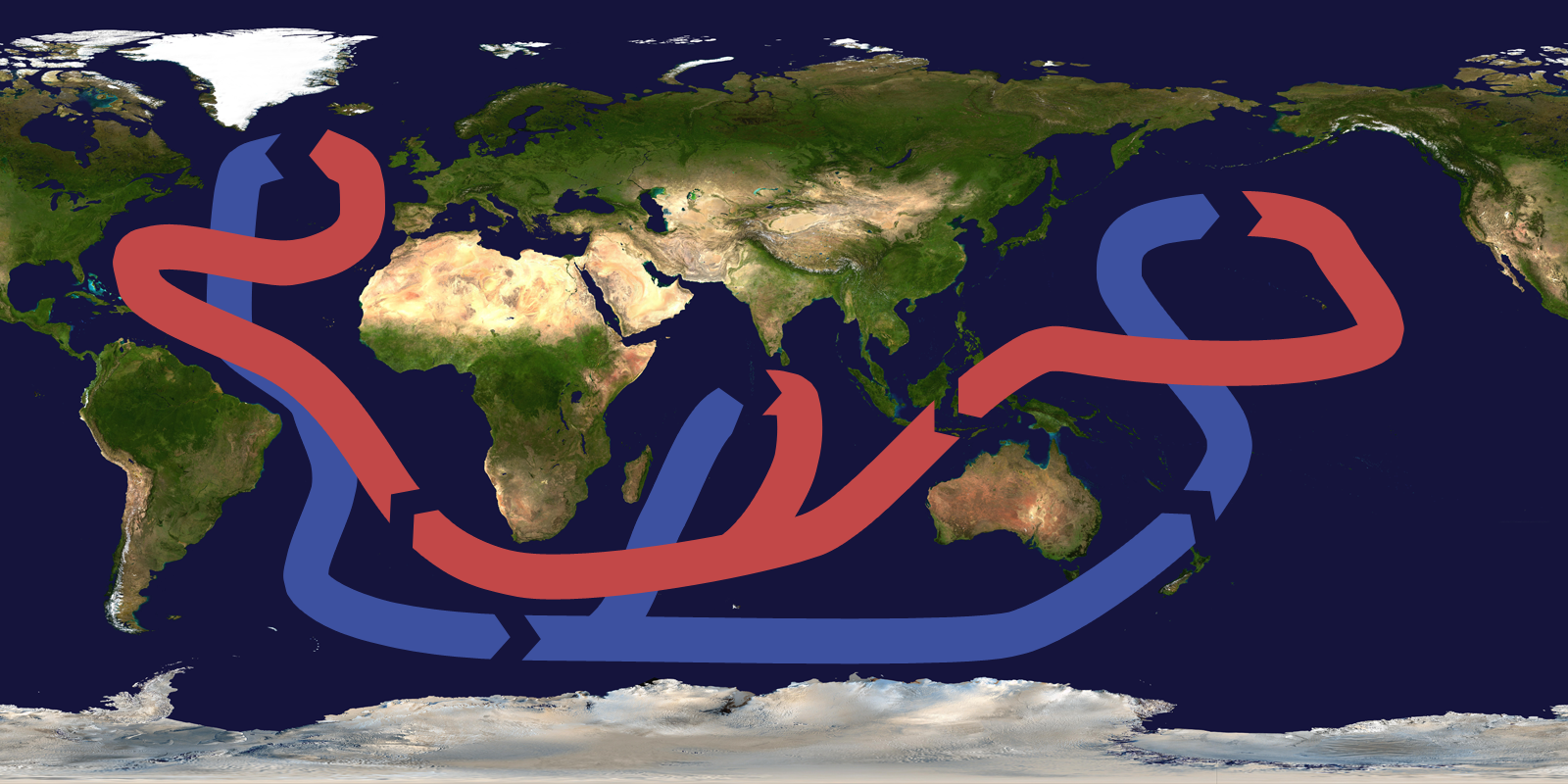
Present-day ocean circulation. The Gulf Stream, far left, may be redirected during Heinrich events.

The Atlantic Heat Piracy model suggests that changes in oceanic circulation cause one hemisphere's oceans to become warmer at the other's expense. Currently, the Gulf Stream redirects warm, equatorial waters towards the northern Nordic Seas. The addition of fresh water to northern oceans may reduce the strength of the Gulf stream and allow a southwards current to develop instead. This would cause the cooling of the northern hemisphere, and the warming of the southern, causing changes in ice accumulation and melting rates and possibly triggering shelf destruction and Heinrich events.

Rohling's 2004 Bipolar model suggests that sea level rise lifted buoyant ice shelves, causing their destabilisation and destruction. Without a floating ice shelf to support them, continental ice sheets would flow out towards the oceans and disintegrate into icebergs and sea ice.

Freshwater addition has been implicated by coupled ocean and atmosphere climate modeling, showing that both Heinrich and Dansgaard–Oeschger events may show hysteresis behaviour. This means that relatively minor changes in freshwater loading into the Nordic Seas, such as a 0.15 Sv increase or 0.03 Sv decrease, would suffice to cause profound shifts in global circulation. The results show that a Heinrich event does not cause a cooling around Greenland but further south, mostly in the subtropical Atlantic, a finding supported by most available paleoclimatic data. This idea was connected to D-O events by Maslin et al. (2001). They suggested that each ice sheet had its own conditions of stability, but that on melting, the influx of freshwater was enough to reconfigure ocean currents, and cause melting elsewhere. More specifically, D-O cold events, and their associated influx of meltwater, reduce the strength of the North Atlantic Deep Water current (NADW), weakening the northern-hemisphere circulation and therefore resulting in an increased transfer of heat polewards in the southern hemisphere. This warmer water results in melting of Antarctic ice, thereby reducing density stratification and the strength of the Antarctic Bottom Water current (AABW). This allows the NADW to return to its previous strength, driving northern hemisphere melting and another D-O cold event. Eventually, the accumulation of melting reaches a threshold, whereby it raises sea level enough to undercut the Laurentide Ice Sheet, thereby causing a Heinrich event and resetting the cycle.

Hunt & Malin (1998) proposed that Heinrich events are caused by earthquakes triggered near the ice margin by rapid deglaciation.

== See also ==
- Ice sheet dynamics
- Bond event

== Sources ==
- Alley, R.B.; MacAyeal, D.R. (1994). "Ice-rafted debris associated with binge/purge oscillations of the Laurentide Ice Sheet" (PDF). Paleoceanography and Paleoclimatology. 9 (4): 503–512. Bibcode:1994PalOc...9..503A. doi:10.1029/94PA01008.
- Bazin, L.; Landais, A.; Lemieux-Dudon, B.; Toyé Mahamadou Kele, H.; Veres, D.; Parrenin, F.; Martinerie, P.; Ritz, C.; Capron, E.; Lipenkov, V.; Loutre, M.-F.; Raynaud, D.; Vinther, B.; Svensson, A.; Rasmussen, S.O.; Severi, M.; Blunier, T.; Leuenberger, M.; Fischer, H.; Masson-Delmotte, V.; Chappellaz, J.; Wolff, E. (2013). "An optimized multi-proxy, multi-site Antarctic ice and gas orbital chronology (AICC2012): 120–800 ka". Climate of the Past. 9 (6): 1715–1731. Bibcode:2013CliPa...9.1715B. doi:10.5194/cpd-8-5963-2012.
- Bond, Gerard C.; Showers, William; Elliot, Mary; Evans, Michael; Lotti, Rusty; Hajdas, Irka; Bonani, Georges; Johnson, Sigfus (1999-01-01). Clark, Peter U.; Webb, Robert S.; Keigwin, Lloyd D. (eds.). Mechanisms of Global Climate Change at Millennial Time Scales. American Geophysical Union. pp. 35–58. doi:10.1029/gm112p0035. ISBN 978-1-118-66474-2.
- Chapman, M.R.; Shackleton, N.J. (1999). "Global ice-volume fluctuations, North Atlantic ice-rafting events, and deep-ocean circulation changes between 130 and 70 ka". Geology. 27 (9): 795–798. Bibcode:1999Geo....27..795C. doi:10.1130/0091-7613(1999)027<0795:GIVFNA>2.3.CO;2.
- EPICA community members (2006). "One-to-one coupling of glacial climate variability in Greenland and Antarctica" (PDF). Nature. 444 (7116): 195–198. Bibcode:2006Natur.444..195E. doi:10.1038/nature05301. hdl:11250/174208. PMID 17099953. S2CID 4341221.
- Kindler, P.; Guillevic, M.; Baumgartner, M.; Schwander, J.; Landais, A.; Leuenberger, M. (2014). "Temperature reconstruction from 10 to 120 kyr b2k from the NGRIP ice core". Climate of the Past. 10 (2): 887–902. Bibcode:2014CliPa..10..887K. doi:10.5194/cp-10-887-2014.
- NGRIP members (2004). "High-resolution record of Northern Hemisphere climate extending into the last interglacial period" (PDF). Nature. 431 (7005): 147–151. Bibcode:2004Natur.431..147A. doi:10.1038/nature02805. PMID 15356621. S2CID 4418682.
- Obrochta, Stephen P.; Miyahara, Hiroko; Yokoyama, Yusuke; Crowley, Thomas J. (2012-11-08). "A re-examination of evidence for the North Atlantic "1500-year cycle" at Site 609". Quaternary Science Reviews. 55: 23–33. Bibcode:2012QSRv...55...23O. doi:10.1016/j.quascirev.2012.08.008.
- Rashid, H.; Hesse, R.; Piper, D.J.W. (2003). "Evidence for an additional Heinrich event between H5 and H6 in the Labrador Sea". Paleoceanography and Paleoclimatology. 18 (4): 1077. Bibcode:2003PalOc..18.1077R. doi:10.1029/2003PA000913. S2CID 35931960.
- Rasmussen, T.L.; Oppo, D.; Thomsen, E.; Lehman, S. (2003). "Deep sea records from the southeast Labrador Sea: Ocean circulation changes and ice-rafting events during the last 160,000 years". Paleoceanography and Paleoclimatology. 18 (1): 1018. Bibcode:2003PalOc..18.1018R. doi:10.1029/2001PA000736. S2CID 128720990.
- Rasmussen, S.O.; Bigler, M.; Blockley, S.; Blunier, T.; Buchardt, S. L.; Clausen, H. B.; Cvijanovic, I.; Dahl-Jensen, D.; Johnsen, S. J.; Fischer, H.; Gkinis, V.; Guillevic, M.; Hoek, W.; Lowe, J. J.; Pedro, J.; Popp, T.; Seierstad, I. E.; Steffensen, J.; Svensson, A. M.; Vallelonga, P.; Vinther, B. M.; Walker, M. J.; Wheatley, J.; Winstrup, M. (2014). "A stratigraphic framework for abrupt climatic changes during the Last Glacial period based on three synchronized Greenland ice-core records: refining and extending the INTIMATE event stratigraphy". Quaternary Science Reviews. 106: 14–28. Bibcode:2014QSRv..106...14R. doi:10.1016/j.quascirev.2014.09.007. hdl:2160/30436.
- Rickaby, R.E.M.; Elderfield, H. (2005). "Evidence from the high-latitude North Atlantic for variations in Antarctic Intermediate water flow during the last deglaciation". Geochemistry, Geophysics, Geosystems. 6 (5): Q05001. Bibcode:2005GGG.....6.5001R. doi:10.1029/2004GC000858.
- Veres, D.; Bazin, L.; Landais, A.; Kele, H. T. M.; Lemieux-Dudon, B.; Parrenin, F.; Martinerie, P.; Blayo, E.; Blunier, T.; Capron, E.; Chappellaz, J.; Rasmussen, S. O.; Severi, M.; Svensson, A.; Vinther, B.; Wolff, E.W. (2013). "The Antarctic ice core chronology (AICC2012): an optimized multi-parameter and multi-site dating approach for the last 120 thousand years". Climate of the Past. 9 (4): 1733–1748. Bibcode:2013CliPa...9.1733V. doi:10.5194/cp-9-1733-2013. hdl:2158/969432.
- Vidal, L.; Schneider, R.R.; Marchal, O.; Bickert, T.; Stocker, T.F.; Wefer, G. (1999). "Link between the North and South Atlantic during the Heinrich events of the last glacial period" (PDF). Climate Dynamics. 15 (12): 909–919. Bibcode:1999ClDy...15..909V. CiteSeerX 10.1.1.36.7817. doi:10.1007/s003820050321. S2CID 14241287. Archived from the original (PDF) on 2007-11-29.
