= Ice sheet =

Large mass of glacial ice

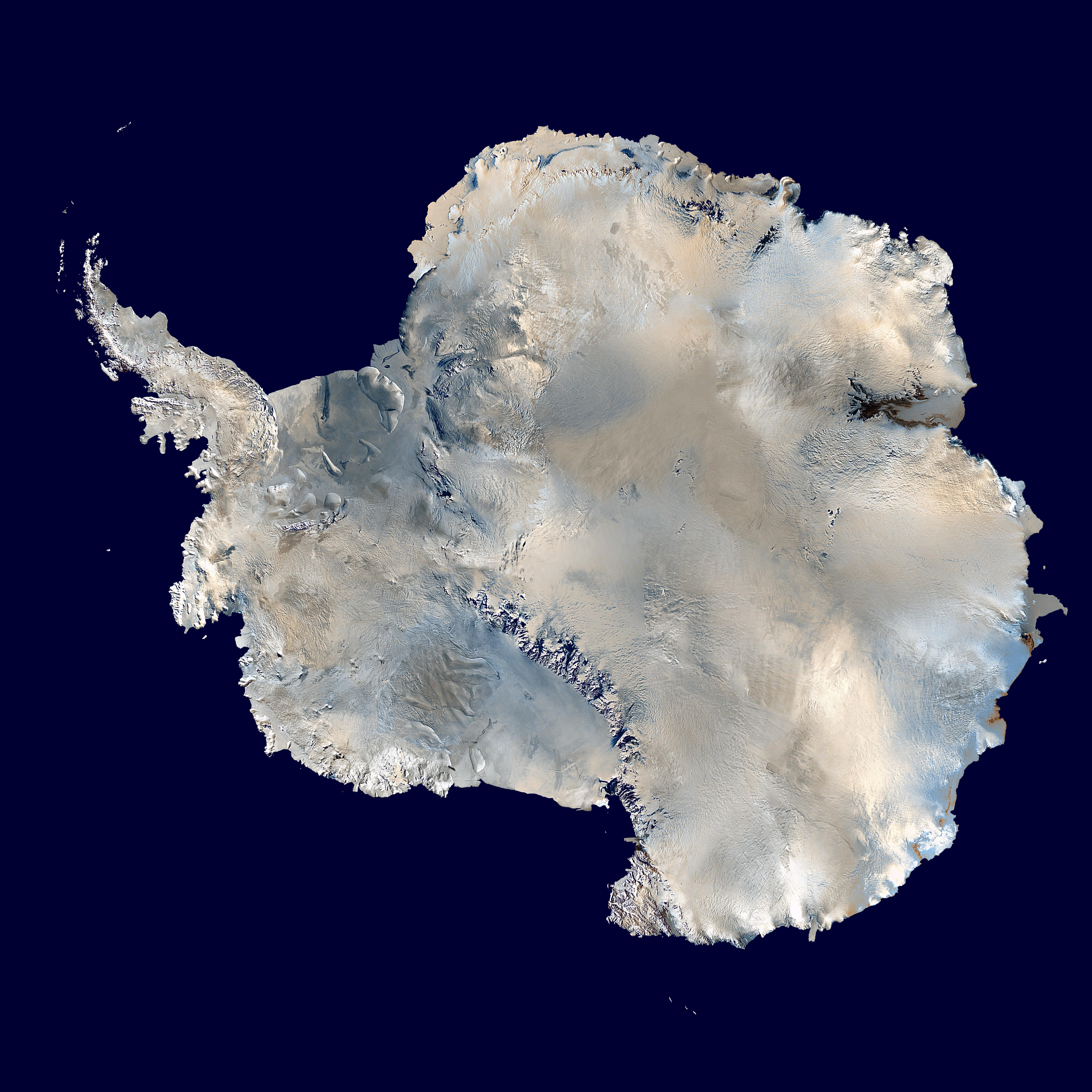
One of Earth's two ice sheets: The Antarctic ice sheet covers about 98% of the Antarctic continent and is the largest single mass of ice on Earth. It has an average thickness of over 2 kilometers.

In glaciology, an ice sheet, also known as a continental glacier, is a mass of glacial ice that covers surrounding terrain and is greater than 50,000 km^{2} (19,000 sq mi).

Ice sheets are the largest glacial bodies on Earth, distinguished from smaller ice caps, ice fields, and glaciers. Ice sheets can have multiple ice domes, the topographic highs from which ice flows outwards, and are typically drained by ice streams and outlet glaciers around their periphery. The two extant ice sheets on Earth are the Antarctic ice sheet and the Greenland ice sheet.

Although the surface is cold, the base of an ice sheet is generally warmer by means of geothermal heat. In places, melting occurs and the melt-water lubricates the ice sheet so that it flows more rapidly. This process produces fast-flowing channels within the ice sheet called ice streams. Ice sheets are continually in motion as the ice gradually flows outward from the highest points of the ice sheet towards its margins. The slope of the ice sheet is low around the plateau but increases steeply at its margins.

The growth of ice sheets is a signature of glacial periods, which occur during ice ages. There have been many different ice sheets over Earth's history. At the maximum of the Last Glacial Period, the historic Laurentide and Cordilleran ice sheets merged with the Greenland Ice Sheet to cover much of North America. In the same period, the Weichselian Ice Sheet covered Northern Europe and the Patagonian Ice Sheet covered southern South America. The retreat and disappearance of these ice sheets marked the beginning of the current Holocene interglacial period, and the ongoing retreat and future fate of the Greenland and Antarctic ice sheets plays a major role in climate change and sea level rise.

== Overview ==
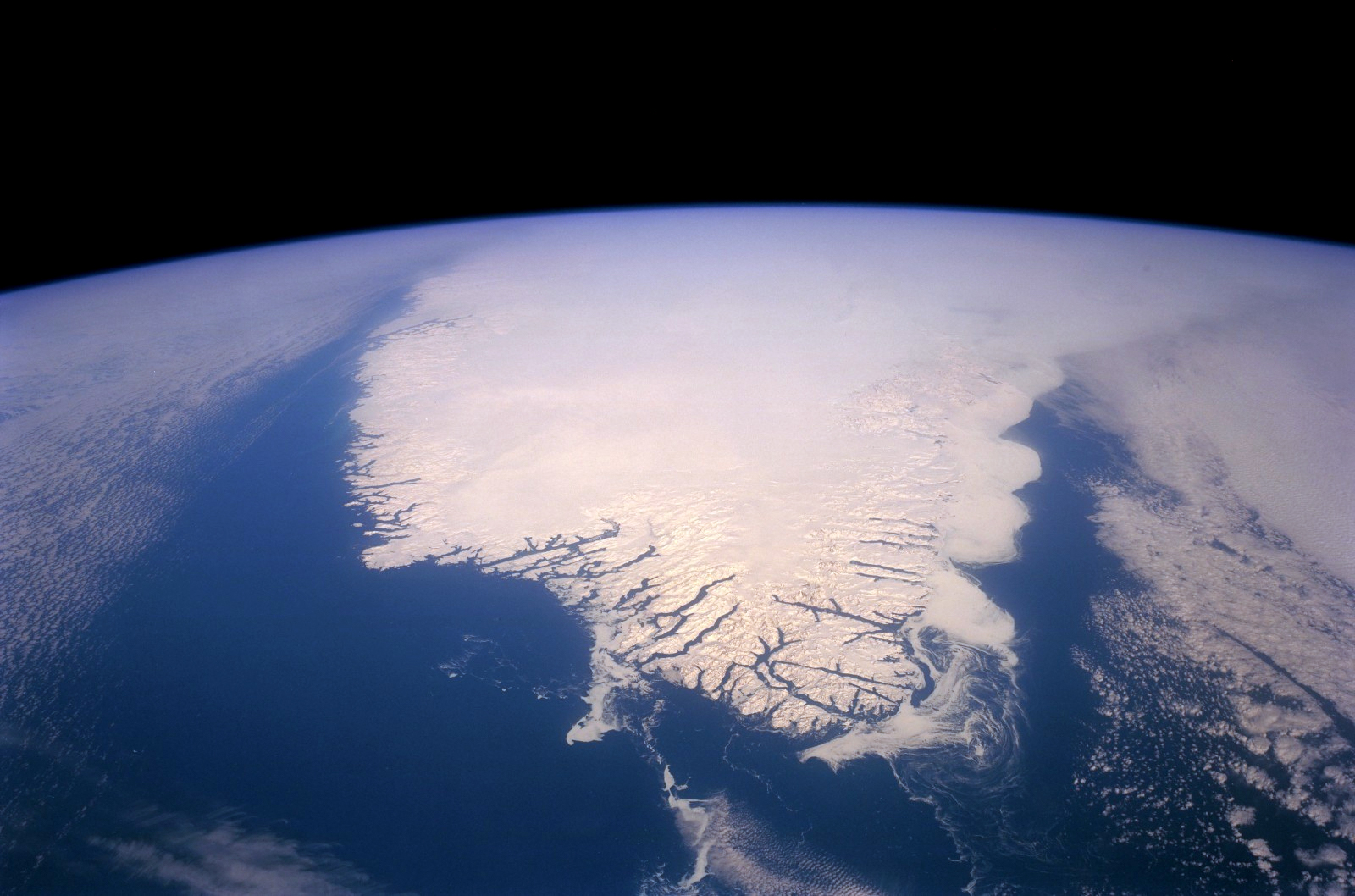
Greenland ice sheet as seen from space

An ice sheet is a body of ice which covers a land area of continental size - meaning that it exceeds 50,000 km^{2}. The currently existing two ice sheets in Greenland and Antarctica have a much greater area than this minimum definition, measuring at 1.7 million km^{2} and 14 million km^{2}, respectively. Both ice sheets are also very thick, as they consist of a continuous ice layer with an average thickness of 2 km (1 mi). This ice layer forms because most of the snow which falls onto the ice sheet never melts, and is instead compressed by the mass of newer snow layers.

This process of ice sheet growth is still occurring nowadays, as can be clearly seen in an example that occurred in World War II. A Lockheed P-38 Lightning fighter plane crashed in Greenland in 1942. It was only recovered 50 years later. By then, it had been buried under 81 m (268 feet) of ice which had formed over that time period.

== Dynamics ==
=== Glacial flows ===
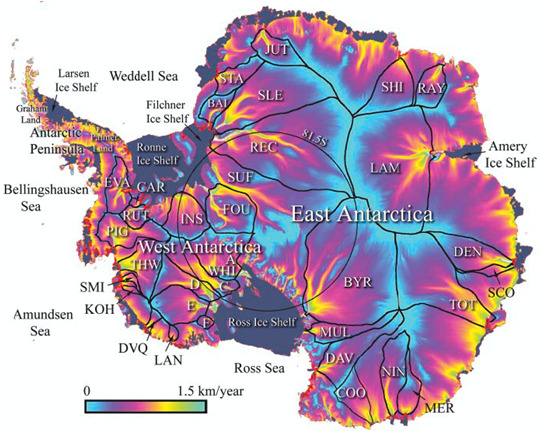
Glacial flow rate in the Antarctic ice sheet.

The motion of ice in Antarctica

Even stable ice sheets are continually in motion as the ice gradually flows outward from the central plateau, which is the tallest point of the ice sheet, and towards the margins. The ice sheet slope is low around the plateau but increases steeply at the margins. This difference in slope occurs due to an imbalance between high ice accumulation in the central plateau and lower accumulation, as well as higher ablation, at the margins. This imbalance increases the shear stress on a glacier until it begins to flow. The flow velocity and deformation will increase as the equilibrium line between these two processes is approached. This motion is driven by gravity but is controlled by temperature and the strength of individual glacier bases. A number of processes alter these two factors, resulting in cyclic surges of activity interspersed with longer periods of inactivity, on time scales ranging from hourly (i.e. tidal flows) to the centennial (Milankovich cycles).

On an unrelated hour-to-hour basis, surges of ice motion can be modulated by tidal activity. The influence of a 1 m tidal oscillation can be felt as much as 100 km from the sea. During larger spring tides, an ice stream will remain almost stationary for hours at a time, before a surge of around a foot in under an hour, just after the peak high tide; a stationary period then takes hold until another surge towards the middle or end of the falling tide. At neap tides, this interaction is less pronounced, and surges instead occur approximately every 12 hours.

Increasing global air temperatures due to climate change take around 10,000 years to directly propagate through the ice before they influence bed temperatures, but may have an effect through increased surface melting, producing more supraglacial lakes. These lakes may feed warm water to glacial bases and facilitate glacial motion. Lakes of a diameter greater than ~300 m are capable of creating a fluid-filled crevasse to the glacier/bed interface. When these crevasses form, the entirety of the lake's (relatively warm) contents can reach the base of the glacier in as little as 2–18 hours – lubricating the bed and causing the glacier to surge. Water that reaches the bed of a glacier may freeze there, increasing the thickness of the glacier by pushing it up from below.

=== Boundary conditions ===
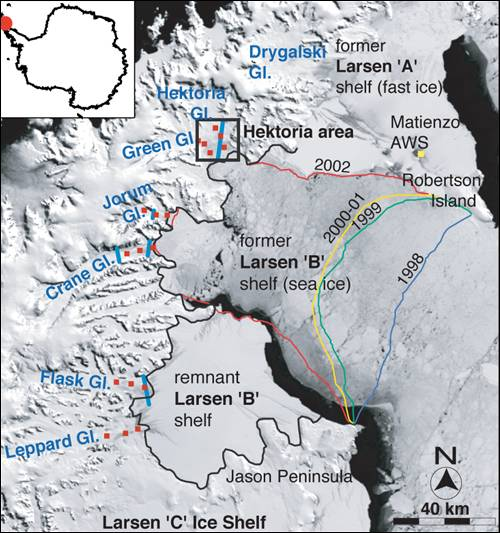
The collapse of the Larsen B ice shelf had profound effects on the velocities of its feeder glaciers.

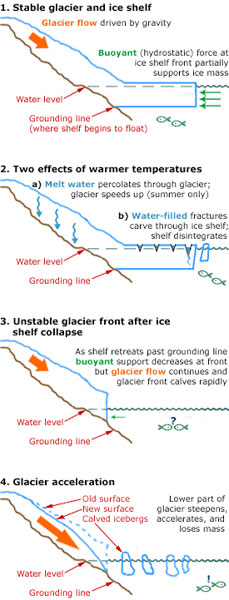
Accelerated ice flows after the break-up of an ice shelf

As the margins end at the marine boundary, excess ice is discharged through ice streams or outlet glaciers. Then, it either falls directly into the sea or is accumulated atop the floating ice shelves. Those ice shelves then calve icebergs at their periphery if they experience excess of ice. Ice shelves would also experience accelerated calving due to basal melting. In Antarctica, this is driven by heat fed to the shelf by the circumpolar deep water current, which is 3 °C above the ice's melting point.

The presence of ice shelves has a stabilizing influence on the glacier behind them, while an absence of an ice shelf becomes destabilizing. For instance, when Larsen B ice shelf in the Antarctic Peninsula had collapsed over three weeks in February 2002, the four glaciers behind it - Crane Glacier, Green Glacier, Hektoria Glacier and Jorum Glacier - all started to flow at a much faster rate, while the two glaciers (Flask and Leppard) stabilized by the remnants of the ice shelf did not accelerate.

The collapse of the Larsen B shelf was preceded by thinning of just 1 metre per year, while some other Antarctic ice shelves have displayed thinning of tens of metres per year. Further, increased ocean temperatures of 1 °C may lead to up to 10 metres per year of basal melting. Ice shelves are always stable under mean annual temperatures of −9 °C, but never stable above −5 °C; this places regional warming of 1.5 °C, as preceded the collapse of Larsen B, in context.

=== Marine ice sheet instability ===
In the 1970s, Johannes Weertman proposed that because seawater is denser than ice, then any ice sheets grounded below sea level inherently become less stable as they melt due to Archimedes' principle. Effectively, these marine ice sheets must have enough mass to exceed the mass of the seawater displaced by the ice, which requires excess thickness. As the ice sheet melts and becomes thinner, the weight of the overlying ice decreases. At a certain point, sea water could force itself into the gaps which form at the base of the ice sheet, and marine ice sheet instability (MISI) would occur.

Even if the ice sheet is grounded below the sea level, MISI cannot occur as long as there is a stable ice shelf in front of it. The boundary between the ice sheet and the ice shelf, known as the grounding line, is particularly stable if it is constrained in an embayment. In that case, the ice sheet may not be thinning at all, as the amount of ice flowing over the grounding line would be likely to match the annual accumulation of ice from snow upstream. Otherwise, ocean warming at the base of an ice shelf tends to thin it through basal melting. As the ice shelf becomes thinner, it exerts less of a buttressing effect on the ice sheet, the so-called back stress increases and the grounding line is pushed backwards. The ice sheet is likely to start losing more ice from the new location of the grounding line and so become lighter and less capable of displacing seawater. This eventually pushes the grounding line back even further, creating a self-reinforcing mechanism.

==== Vulnerable locations ====
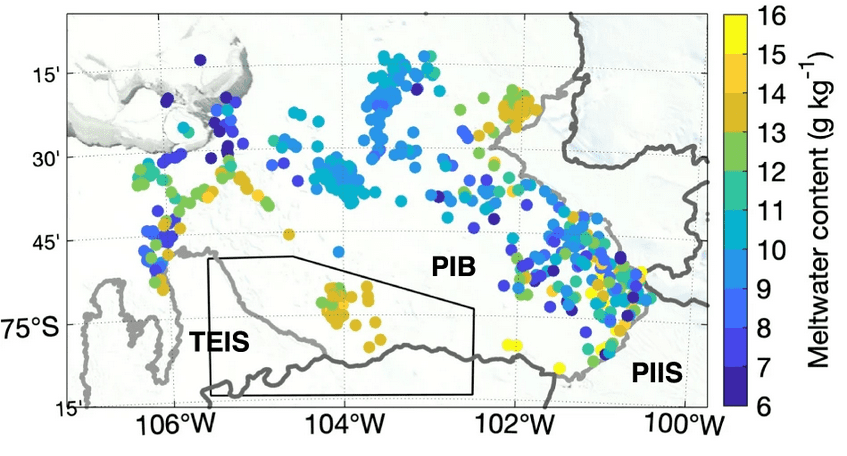
Distribution of meltwater hotspots caused by ice losses in Pine Island Bay, the location of both Thwaites (TEIS refers to Thwaites Eastern Ice Shelf) and Pine Island Glaciers.

Because the entire West Antarctic Ice Sheet is grounded below the sea level, it would be vulnerable to geologically rapid ice loss in this scenario. In particular, the Thwaites and Pine Island glaciers are most likely to be prone to MISI, and both glaciers have been rapidly thinning and accelerating in recent decades. As a result, sea level rise from the ice sheet could be accelerated by tens of centimeters within the 21st century alone.

The majority of the East Antarctic Ice Sheet would not be affected. Totten Glacier is the largest glacier there which is known to be subject to MISI - yet, its potential contribution to sea level rise is comparable to that of the entire West Antarctic Ice Sheet. Totten Glacier has been losing mass nearly monotonically in recent decades, suggesting rapid retreat is possible in the near future, although the dynamic behavior of Totten Ice Shelf is known to vary on seasonal to interannual timescales. The Wilkes Basin is the only major submarine basin in Antarctica that is not thought to be sensitive to warming. Ultimately, even geologically rapid sea level rise would still most likely require several millennia for the entirety of these ice masses (WAIS and the subglacial basins) to be lost.

==== Marine ice cliff instability ====
A collage of footage and animation to explain the changes that are occurring on the West Antarctic Ice Sheet, narrated by glaciologist Eric Rignot

A related process known as Marine Ice Cliff Instability (MICI) posits that ice cliffs which exceed ~90 m (295 1/2 ft) in above-ground height and are ~800 m (2,624 1/2 ft) in basal (underground) height are likely to collapse under their own weight once the peripheral ice stabilizing them is gone. Their collapse then exposes the ice masses following them to the same instability, potentially resulting in a self-sustaining cycle of cliff collapse and rapid ice sheet retreat - i.e. sea level rise of a meter or more by 2100 from Antarctica alone. This theory had been highly influential - in a 2020 survey of 106 experts, the paper which had advanced this theory was considered more important than even the year 2014 IPCC Fifth Assessment Report. Sea level rise projections which involve MICI are much larger than the others, particularly under high warming rate.

At the same time, this theory has also been highly controversial. It was originally proposed in order to describe how the large sea level rise during the Pliocene and the Last Interglacial could have occurred - yet more recent research found that these sea level rise episodes can be explained without any ice cliff instability taking place. Research in Pine Island Bay in West Antarctica (the location of Thwaites and Pine Island Glacier) had found seabed gouging by ice from the Younger Dryas period which appears consistent with MICI. However, it indicates "relatively rapid" yet still prolonged ice sheet retreat, with a movement of >200 km (120 mi) inland taking place over an estimated 1100 years (from ~12,300 years Before Present to ~11,200 B.P.)

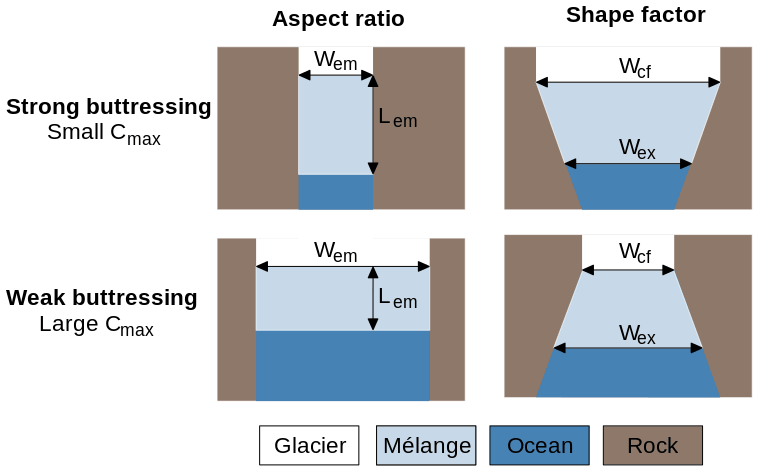
If MICI can occur, the structure of the glacier embayment (viewed from the top) would do a lot to determine how quickly it may proceed. Bays which are deep or narrow towards the exit would experience much less rapid retreat than the opposite

In recent years, 2002-2004 fast retreat of Crane Glacier immediately after the collapse of the Larsen B ice shelf (before it reached a shallow fjord and stabilized) could have involved MICI, but there weren't enough observations to confirm or refute this theory. The retreat of Greenland ice sheet's three largest glaciers - Jakobshavn, Helheim, and Kangerdlugssuaq Glacier - did not resemble predictions from ice cliff collapse at least up until the end of 2013, but an event observed at Helheim Glacier in August 2014 may fit the definition. Further, modelling done after the initial hypothesis indicates that ice-cliff instability would require implausibly fast ice shelf collapse (i.e. within an hour for ~90 m (295 1/2 ft)-tall cliffs), unless the ice had already been substantially damaged beforehand. Further, ice cliff breakdown would produce a large number of debris in the coastal waters - known as ice mélange - and multiple studies indicate their build-up would slow or even outright stop the instability soon after it started.

Some scientists - including the originators of the hypothesis, Robert DeConto and David Pollard - have suggested that the best way to resolve the question would be to precisely determine sea level rise during the Last Interglacial. MICI can be effectively ruled out if SLR at the time was lower than 4 m (13 ft), while it is very likely if the SLR was greater than 6 m (19 1/2 ft). As of 2023, the most recent analysis indicates that the Last Interglacial SLR is unlikely to have been higher than 2.7 m (9 ft), as higher values in other research, such as 5.7 m (18 1/2 ft), appear inconsistent with the new paleoclimate data from The Bahamas and the known history of the Greenland Ice Sheet.

== Earth's current two ice sheets ==
Complete melting of global ice sheets and glaciers could take thousands of years, but would produce 66 m (216 ft) of sea level rise. (Melting of sea ice and ice shelves does not affect sea level.)

=== Antarctic ice sheet ===
The Antarctic ice sheet is a continental glacier covering 98% of the Antarctic continent, with an area of 14 million square kilometres (5.4 million square miles) and an average thickness of over 2 kilometres (1.2 mi). It is the largest of Earth's two current ice sheets, containing 26.5 million cubic kilometres (6,400,000 cubic miles) of ice, which is equivalent to 61% of all fresh water on Earth. Its surface is nearly continuous, and the only ice-free areas on the continent are the dry valleys, nunataks of the Antarctic mountain ranges, and sparse coastal bedrock. It is often subdivided into the Antarctic Peninsula (AP), the East Antarctic Ice Sheet (EAIS), and the West Antarctic Ice Sheet (WAIS), due to the large differences in glacier mass balance, ice flow, and topography between the three regions.

==== East Antarctic Ice Sheet ====
East Antarctic Ice Sheet
- Type: Ice sheet
- Thickness: ~2.2 km (1.4 mi) (average), ~4.9 km (3.0 mi) (maximum)

The East Antarctic Ice Sheet (EAIS) is the sector of the Antarctic Ice Sheet covering East Antarctica. The ice sheet first formed around 34 million years ago, and, considered independently, is the largest ice sheet on Earth, with greater volume than the Greenland Ice Sheet or the West Antarctic Ice Sheet (WAIS). It is around 2.2 km (1.4 mi) thick on average and is 4,897 m (16,066 ft) at its thickest point. It is separated from WAIS by the Transantarctic Mountains. The EAIS is home to the geographic South Pole, magnetic south pole and the Amundsen–Scott South Pole Station.

The surface of the EAIS is the driest, windiest, and coldest place on Earth. Lack of moisture in the air, high albedo from the snow as well as the surface's consistently high elevation results in the reported cold temperature records of nearly −100 °C (−148 °F). It is the only place on Earth cold enough for atmospheric temperature inversion to occur consistently. That is, while the atmosphere is typically warmest near the surface and becomes cooler at greater elevation, atmosphere during the Antarctic winter is cooler at the surface than in its middle layers. Consequently, greenhouse gases actually trap heat in the middle atmosphere and reduce its flow towards the surface while the temperature inversion lasts.

East Antarctica has experienced slight cooling for decades while the rest of the world has warmed as the result of climate change. Clear warming over East Antarctica started has occurred at least since the year 2000 but was not conclusively detected until the 2020s. In the early 2000s, cooling over East Antarctica seemingly outweighed warming over the rest of the continent. It was frequently misinterpreted by the media and occasionally used as an argument for climate change denial.

After 2009, improvements in Antarctica's instrumental temperature record proved consistent warming over West Antarctica. Net warming has occurred across the continent since 1957. Because the East Antarctic ice sheet has warmed unevenly, it is still gaining ice on average. GRACE satellite data indicated East Antarctica mass gain of 60 ± 13 billion tons per year between 2002 and 2010. It will most likely see sustained losses of ice at its most vulnerable locations such as Totten Glacier and Wilkes Basin.

==== West Antarctic Ice Sheet ====
West Antarctic Ice Sheet
- Type: Ice sheet
- Area: <1,970,000 km^{2} (760,000 mi^{2})
- Thickness: ~1.05 km (0.7 mi) (average), ~2 km (1.2 mi) (maximum)
- Status: Receding

The West Antarctic Ice Sheet (WAIS) is the sector of the Antarctic Ice Sheet covering West Antarctica. The WAIS is a marine ice sheet, as the majority of its ice is grounded well below sea level, on rock and sediment that would be the ocean floor if the ice were to retreat. The ice sheet first formed about 27 million years ago, likely fed partially by advancing glaciers of the older East Antarctic Ice Sheet . The WAIS is bounded by the Ross Ice Shelf, the Ronne Ice Shelf, and outlet glaciers that drain into the Amundsen Sea.

As a smaller part of Antarctica, WAIS is also more strongly affected by climate change. There has been warming over the ice sheet since the 1950s, and a substantial retreat of its coastal glaciers since at least the 1990s. Estimates suggest it added around 7.6 ± 3.9 mm (0.30 ± 0.15 in) to the global sea level rise between 1992 and 2017, and has been losing ice in the 2010s at a rate equivalent to 0.4 millimetres (0.016 inches) of annual sea level rise. While some of its losses are offset by the growth of the East Antarctic Ice Sheet, Antarctica as a whole will most likely lose enough ice by 2100 to add 11 cm (4.3 in) to sea levels. Further, marine ice sheet instability may increase this amount by tens of centimeters, particularly under high warming. Fresh meltwater from WAIS also contributes to ocean stratification and dilutes the formation of salty Antarctic bottom water, which destabilizes Southern Ocean overturning circulation.

In the long term, the West Antarctic Ice Sheet is likely to disappear due to the warming which has already occurred. Paleoclimate evidence suggests that this has already happened during the Eemian period, when the global temperatures were similar to the early 21st century. It is believed that the loss of the ice sheet would take place between 2,000 and 13,000 years in the future, although several centuries of high emissions may shorten this to 500 years. 3.3 m (10 ft 10 in) of sea level rise would occur if the ice sheet collapses but leaves ice caps on the mountains behind. Total sea level rise from West Antarctica increases to 4.3 m (14 ft 1 in) if they melt as well, but this would require a higher level of warming. Isostatic rebound of ice-free land may also add around 1 m (3 ft 3 in) to the global sea levels over another 1,000 years.

The preservation of WAIS may require a persistent reduction of global temperatures to 1 °C (1.8 °F) below the preindustrial level, or to 2 °C (3.6 °F) below the temperature of 2020. Because the collapse of the ice sheet would be preceded by the loss of Thwaites Glacier and Pine Island Glacier, some have instead proposed interventions to preserve them. In theory, adding thousands of gigatonnes of artificially created snow could stabilize them, but it would be extraordinarily difficult and may not account for the ongoing acceleration of ocean warming in the area. Others suggest that building obstacles to warm water flows beneath glaciers would be able to delay the disappearance of the ice sheet by many centuries, but it would still require one of the largest civil engineering interventions in history.

=== Greenland ice sheet ===
Greenland ice sheet
- Grønlands indlandsis Sermersuaq
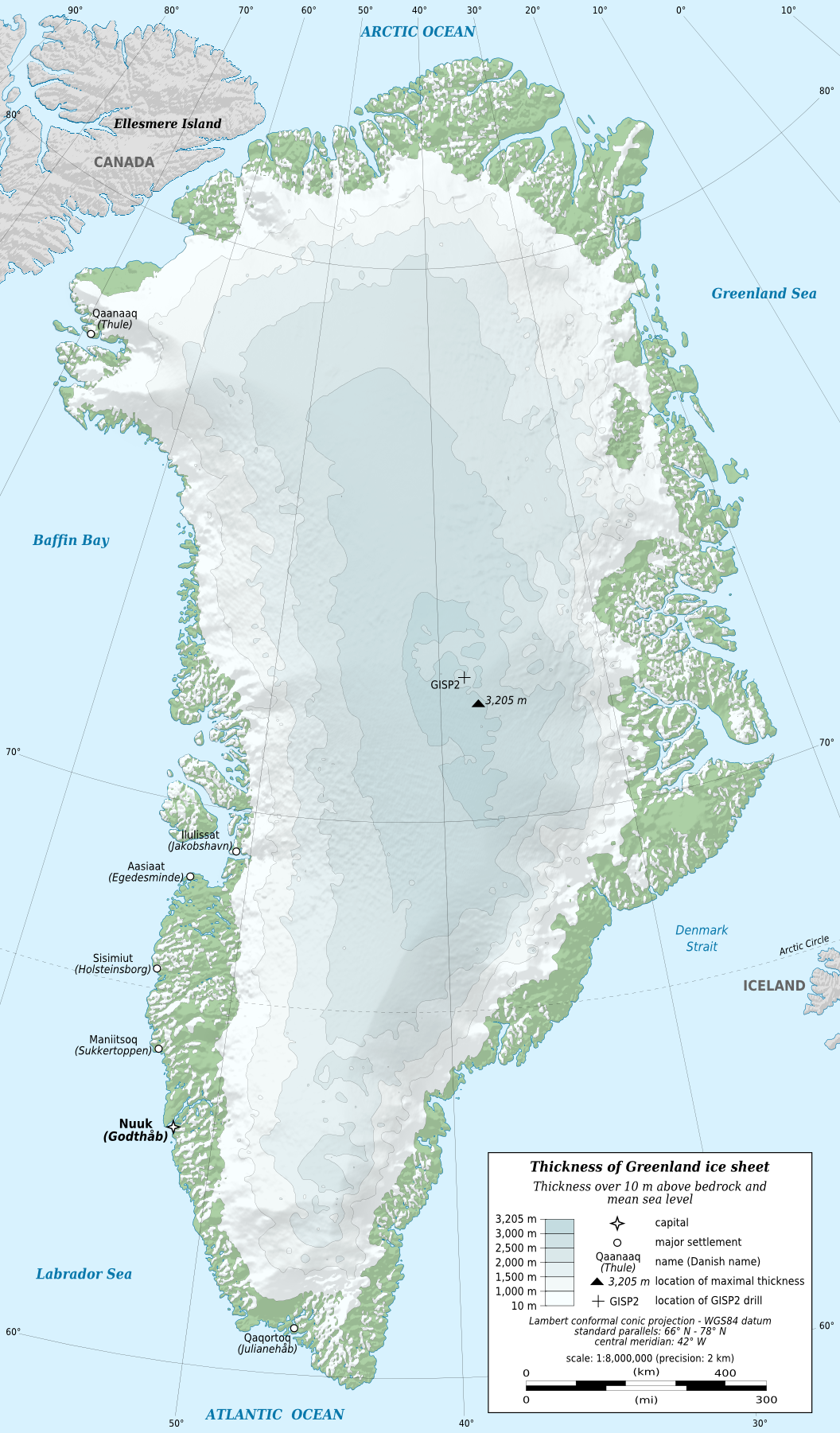
- Interactive map of Greenland ice sheet
- Type: Ice sheet
- Coordinates: 76°42′N 41°12′W
- Area: 1,710,000 km^{2} (660,000 mi^{2})
- Length: 2,400 km (1,500 mi)
- Width: 1,100 km (680 mi)
- Thickness: 1.67 km (1.0 mi) (average), ~3.5 km (2.2 mi) (maximum)

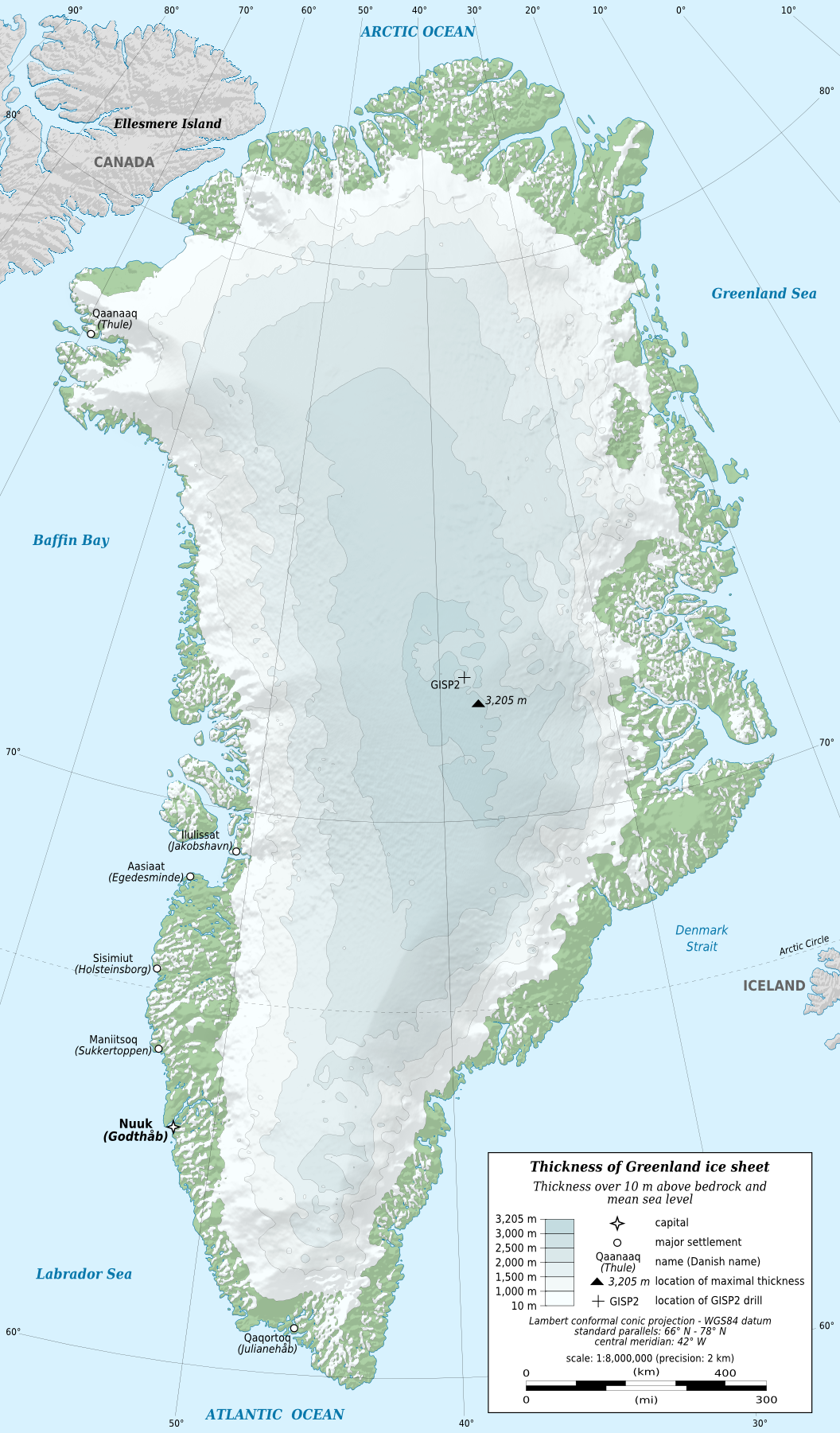

The Greenland ice sheet is an ice sheet which forms the second-largest body of ice in the world. It is an average of 1,673 m (5,489 ft) thick and over 3,488 m (11,444 ft) thick at its maximum. It is almost 2,900 kilometres (1,800 mi) long in a north–south direction, with a maximum width of 1,100 kilometres (680 mi) at a latitude of 77°N, near its northern edge. The ice sheet covers 1,700,000 square kilometres (656,000 sq mi), around 80% of the surface of Greenland, or about 12% of the area of the Antarctic ice sheet. The term 'Greenland ice sheet' is often shortened to GIS or GrIS in scientific literature.

Greenland has had major glaciers and ice caps for at least 18 million years, but a single ice sheet first covered most of the island some 2.6 million years ago. Since then, it has both grown and contracted significantly. The oldest known ice on Greenland is about 1 million years old. Due to anthropogenic greenhouse gas emissions, the ice sheet is now the warmest it has been in the past 1000 years, and is losing ice at the fastest rate in at least the past 12,000 years.

Every summer, parts of the surface melt and ice cliffs calve into the sea. Normally the ice sheet would be replenished by winter snowfall, but due to global warming the ice sheet is melting two to five times faster than before 1850, and snowfall has not kept up since 1996. If the Paris Agreement goal of staying below 2 °C (3.6 °F) is achieved, melting of Greenland ice alone would still add around 6 cm (2 1/2 in) to global sea level rise by the end of the century. If there are no reductions in emissions, melting would add around 13 cm (5 in) by 2100, with a worst-case of about 33 cm (13 in). For comparison, melting has so far contributed 1.4 cm (1/2 in) since 1972, while sea level rise from all sources was 15–25 cm (6–10 in) between 1901 and 2018.

If all 2,900,000 cubic kilometres (696,000 cu mi) of the ice sheet were to melt, it would increase global sea levels by ~7.4 m (24 ft). Global warming between 1.7 °C (3.1 °F) and 2.3 °C (4.1 °F) would likely make this melting inevitable. However, 1.5 °C (2.7 °F) would still cause ice loss equivalent to 1.4 m (4 1/2 ft) of sea level rise, and more ice will be lost if the temperatures exceed that level before declining. If global temperatures continue to rise, the ice sheet will likely disappear within 10,000 years. At very high warming, its future lifetime goes down to around 1,000 years. Beneath the Greenland ice sheet are mountains and lake basins.

== Role in carbon cycle ==
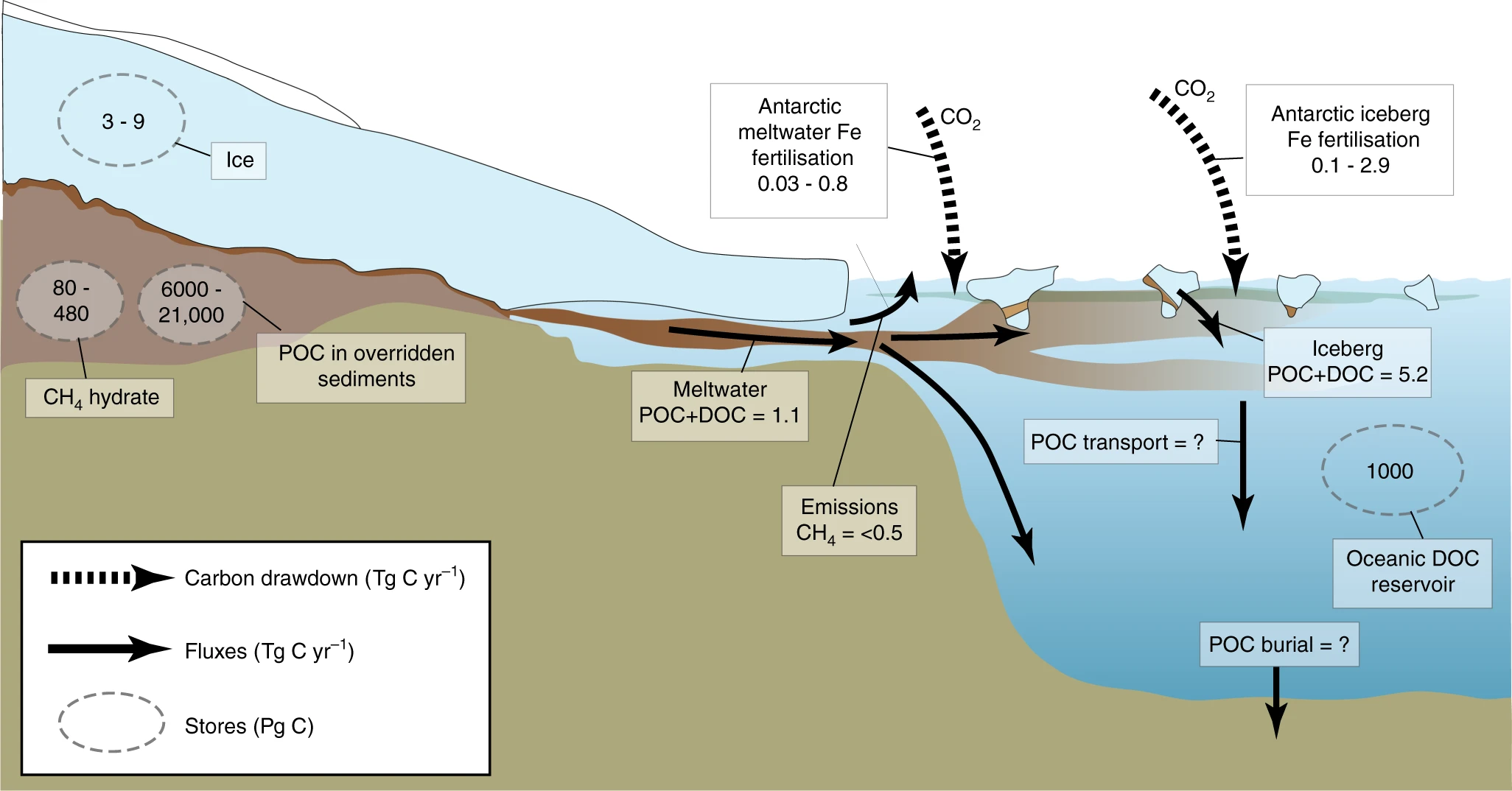
Carbon stores and fluxes in present-day ice sheets (2019), and the predicted impact on carbon dioxide (where data exists). Estimated carbon fluxes are measured in Tg C a^{−1} (megatonnes of carbon per year) and estimated sizes of carbon stores are measured in Pg C (thousands of megatonnes of carbon). DOC = dissolved organic carbon, POC = particulate organic carbon.

Historically, ice sheets were viewed as inert components of the carbon cycle and were largely disregarded in global models. In 2010s, research had demonstrated the existence of uniquely adapted microbial communities, high rates of biogeochemical and physical weathering in ice sheets, and storage and cycling of organic carbon in excess of 100 billion tonnes.

There is a massive contrast in carbon storage between the two ice sheets. While only about 0.5-27 billion tonnes of pure carbon are present underneath the Greenland ice sheet, 6000-21,000 billion tonnes of pure carbon are thought to be located underneath Antarctica. This carbon can act as a climate change feedback if it is gradually released through meltwater, thus increasing overall carbon dioxide emissions.

For comparison, 1400–1650 billion tonnes are contained within the Arctic permafrost. Also for comparison, the annual human caused carbon dioxide emissions amount to around 40 billion tonnes of CO_{2}.

In Greenland, there is one known area, at Russell Glacier, where meltwater carbon is released into the atmosphere as methane, which has a much larger global warming potential than carbon dioxide. However, it also harbours large numbers of methanotrophic bacteria, which limit those emissions.

== In geologic timescales ==
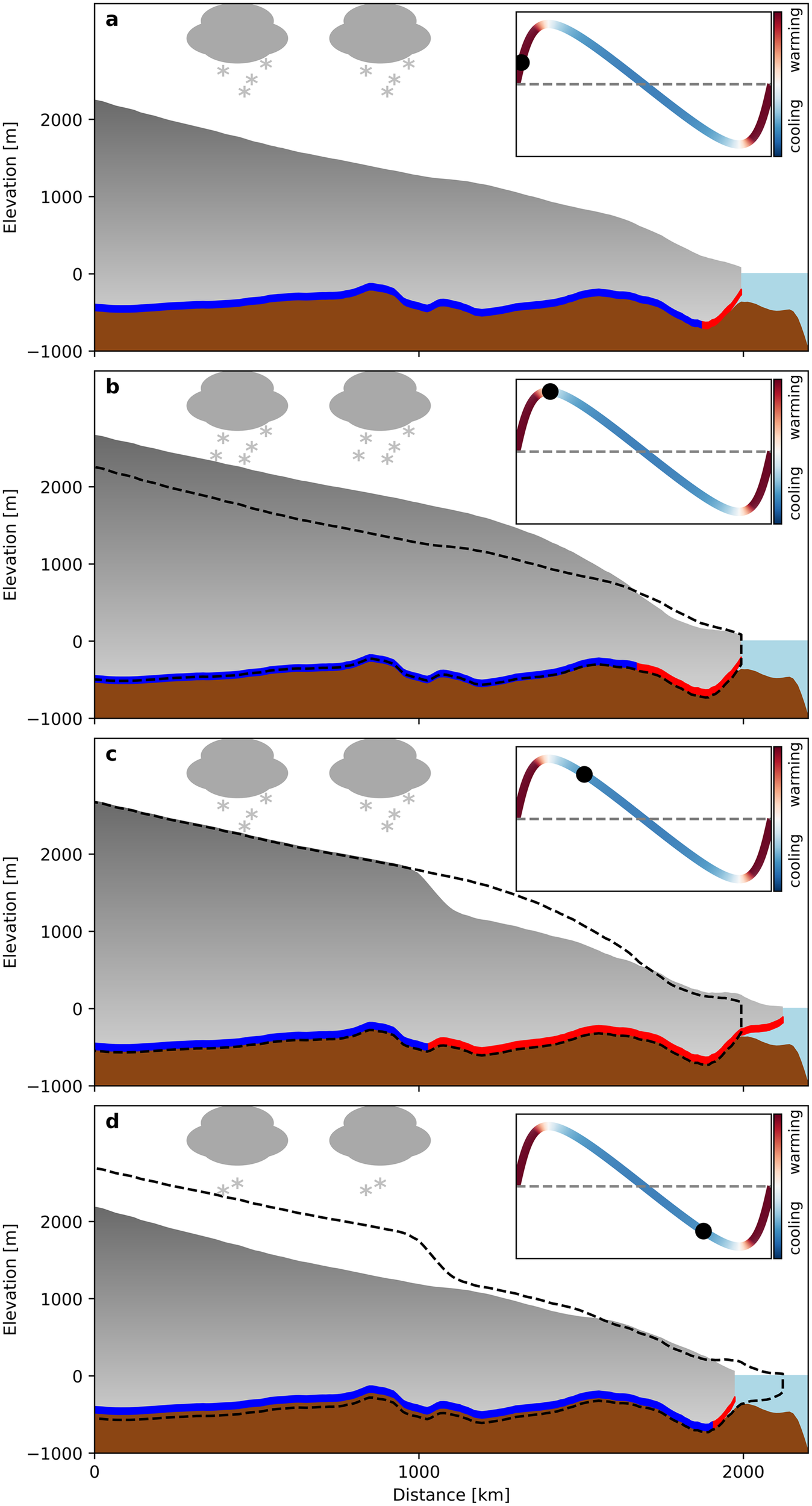
A reconstruction of how Heinrich events would have likely proceeded, with the Laurentide ice sheet first growing to an unsustainable position, where the base of its periphery becomes too warm, and then rapidly losing ice until it is reduced to sustainable size

Normally, the transitions between glacial and interglacial states are governed by Milankovitch cycles, which are patterns in insolation (the amount of sunlight reaching the Earth). These patterns are caused by the variations in shape of the Earth's orbit and its angle relative to the Sun, caused by the gravitational pull of other planets as they go through their own orbits.

For instance, during at least the last 100,000 years, portions of the ice sheet covering much of North America, the Laurentide Ice Sheet broke apart sending large flotillas of icebergs into the North Atlantic. When these icebergs melted they dropped the boulders and other continental rocks they carried, leaving layers known as ice rafted debris. These so-called Heinrich events, named after their discoverer Hartmut Heinrich, appear to have a 7,000–10,000-year periodicity, and occur during cold periods within the last interglacial.

Internal ice sheet "binge-purge" cycles may be responsible for the observed effects, where the ice builds to unstable levels, then a portion of the ice sheet collapses. External factors might also play a role in forcing ice sheets. Dansgaard–Oeschger events are abrupt warmings of the northern hemisphere occurring over the space of perhaps 40 years. While these D–O events occur directly after each Heinrich event, they also occur more frequently – around every 1500 years; from this evidence, paleoclimatologists surmise that the same forcings may drive both Heinrich and D–O events.

Hemispheric asynchrony in ice sheet behavior has been observed by linking short-term spikes of methane in Greenland ice cores and Antarctic ice cores. During Dansgaard–Oeschger events, the northern hemisphere warmed considerably, dramatically increasing the release of methane from wetlands, that were otherwise tundra during glacial times. This methane quickly distributes evenly across the globe, becoming incorporated in Antarctic and Greenland ice. With this tie, paleoclimatologists have been able to say that the ice sheets on Greenland only began to warm after the Antarctic ice sheet had been warming for several thousand years. Why this pattern occurs is still open for debate.

=== Antarctic ice sheet during geologic timescales ===
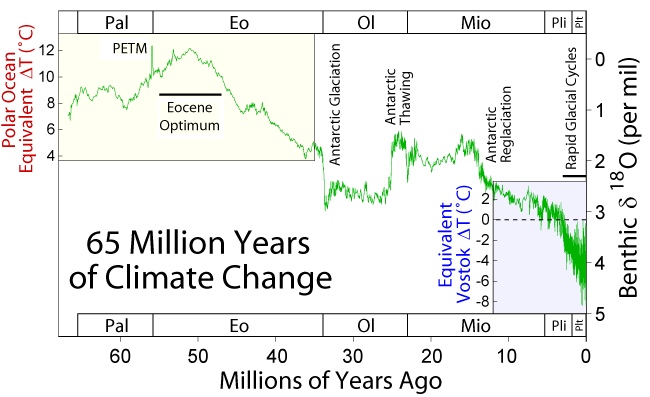
Polar climatic temperature changes throughout the Cenozoic, showing glaciation of Antarctica toward the end of the Eocene, thawing near the end of the Oligocene and subsequent Miocene re-glaciation.

The icing of Antarctica began in the Late Palaeocene or middle Eocene between 60 and 45.5 million years ago and escalated during the Eocene–Oligocene extinction event about 34 million years ago. CO_{2} levels were then about 760 ppm and had been decreasing from earlier levels in the thousands of ppm. Carbon dioxide decrease, with a tipping point of 600 ppm, was the primary agent forcing Antarctic glaciation. The glaciation was favored by an interval when Earth's orbit favored cool summers but oxygen isotope ratio cycle marker changes were too large to be explained by Antarctic ice-sheet growth alone indicating an ice age of some size. The opening of the Drake Passage may have played a role as well though models of the changes suggest declining CO_{2} levels to have been more important.

The Western Antarctic ice sheet declined somewhat during the warm early Pliocene epoch, approximately five to three million years ago; during this time the Ross Sea opened up. But there was no significant decline in the land-based Eastern Antarctic ice sheet.

=== Greenland ice sheet during geologic timescales ===
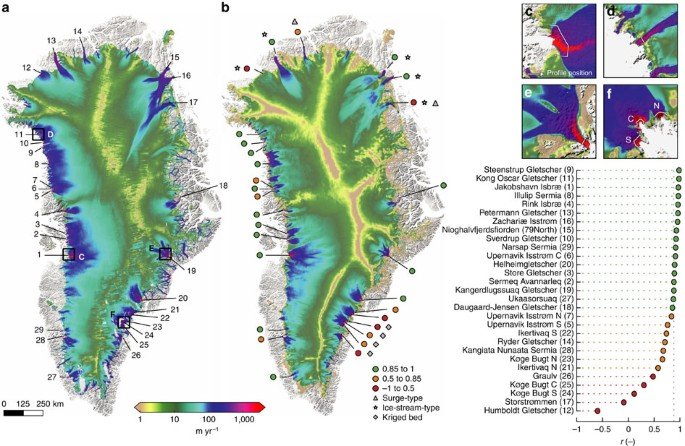
The pattern of ice flows at the Greenland ice sheet, with arrows pointing to outlet glaciers where ice calving occurs

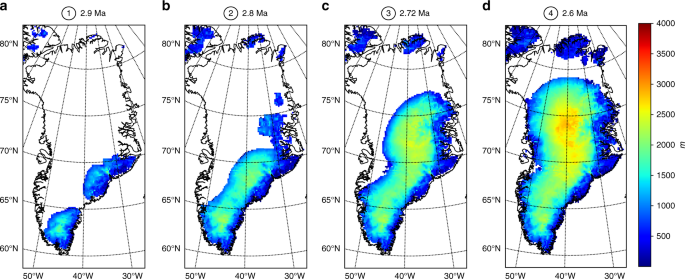
Timeline of the ice sheet's formation from 2.9 to 2.6 million years ago

While there is evidence of large glaciers in Greenland for most of the past 18 million years, these ice bodies were probably similar to various smaller modern examples, such as Maniitsoq and Flade Isblink, which cover 76,000 and 100,000 square kilometres (29,000 and 39,000 sq mi) around the periphery. Conditions in Greenland were not initially suitable for a single coherent ice sheet to develop, but this began to change around 10 million years ago, during the middle Miocene, when the two passive continental margins which now form the uplands of West and East Greenland experienced uplift, and ultimately formed the upper planation surface at a height of 2000 to 3000 meter above sea level.

Later uplift, during the Pliocene, formed a lower planation surface at 500 to 1000 meters above sea level. A third stage of uplift created multiple valleys and fjords below the planation surfaces. This uplift intensified glaciation due to increased orographic precipitation and cooler surface temperatures, allowing ice to accumulate and persist. As recently as 3 million years ago, during the Pliocene warm period, Greenland's ice was limited to the highest peaks in the east and the south. Ice cover gradually expanded since then, until the atmospheric carbon dioxide levels dropped to between 280 and 320 ppm 2.7–2.6 million years ago, by which time temperatures had dropped sufficiently for the disparate ice caps to connect and cover most of the island.

== See also ==
- Cryosphere – Earth's surface where water is frozen
- Ice planet – Planet with an icy surface
- Quaternary glaciation – Series of alternating glacial and interglacial periods
- Snowball Earth – Worldwide glaciation episodes during the Proterozoic eon
- Wisconsin glaciation – Glaciation in North America during the Last Glacial Period
- Ice-sheet model – Simulation of ice sheet change
