= Anil Kumar Gupta (scientist) =

Indian professor (born 1960)

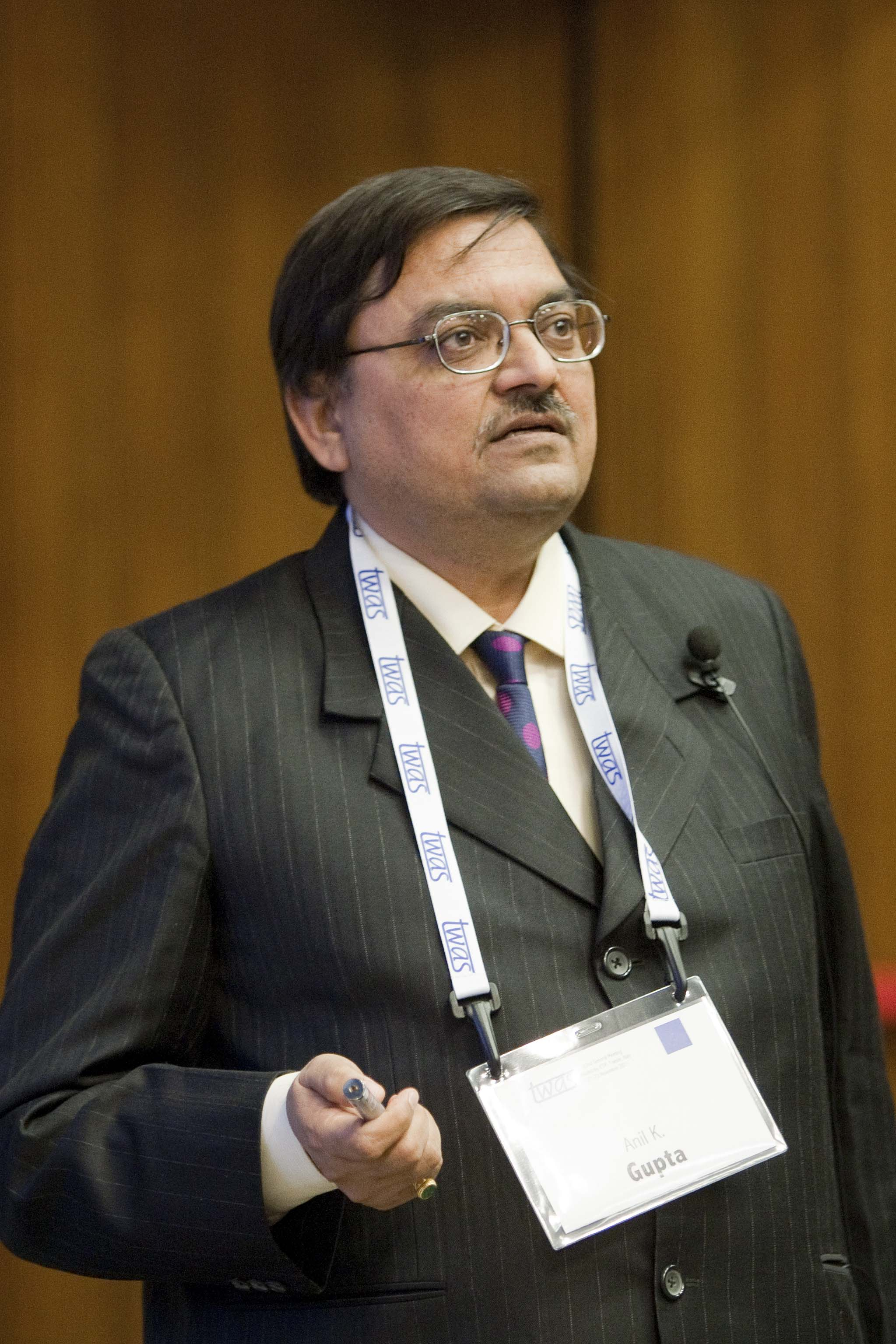
- Anil Kumar Gupta, professor at IIT Kharagpur
- Born: 1960 (age 65–66); Budaun district, Uttar Pradesh, India
- Education: Aligarh Muslim University (B.Sc, M.Sc); Banaras Hindu University (Ph.D.)
- Scientific career
- Fields: Geology and geophysics

Anil Kumar Gupta (born 1960) is an Indian geologist and academic. His research focuses on paleomonsoon dynamics, paleoclimatology, and paleoceanography, with an emphasis on reconstructing past variability of the Indian Summer Monsoon using micropaleontological and sedimentary proxies.

Gupta served as a director of the Wadia Institute of Himalayan Geology from 2010 to 2017 and was Head of the Department of Geology & Geophysics at Indian Institute of Technology Kharagpur from 2006 to 2009.

He was awarded the The World Academy of Sciences Prize in Earth Sciences in 2010 for his contributions to palaeoclimatology.

== Early life and career ==
Gupta was born in the Budaun district of Uttar Pradesh in 1960. He obtained his PhD in 1987 from Banaras Hindu University, Varanasi and joined the Department of Geology and Geophysics at IIT Kharagpur as a lecturer the same year.

At IIT Kharagpur, he served as Head of the Department of Geology and Geophysics from 2006 to 2009 and later as Head of the Centre for Oceans, Rivers, Atmosphere, and Land Sciences (CORAL) from 2018 to 2021.

Gupta served as Director of the Wadia Institute of Himalayan Geology from 2010 to 2017.

His career has included additional academic and research affiliations, including international fellowships and research associate positions.

== Awards ==
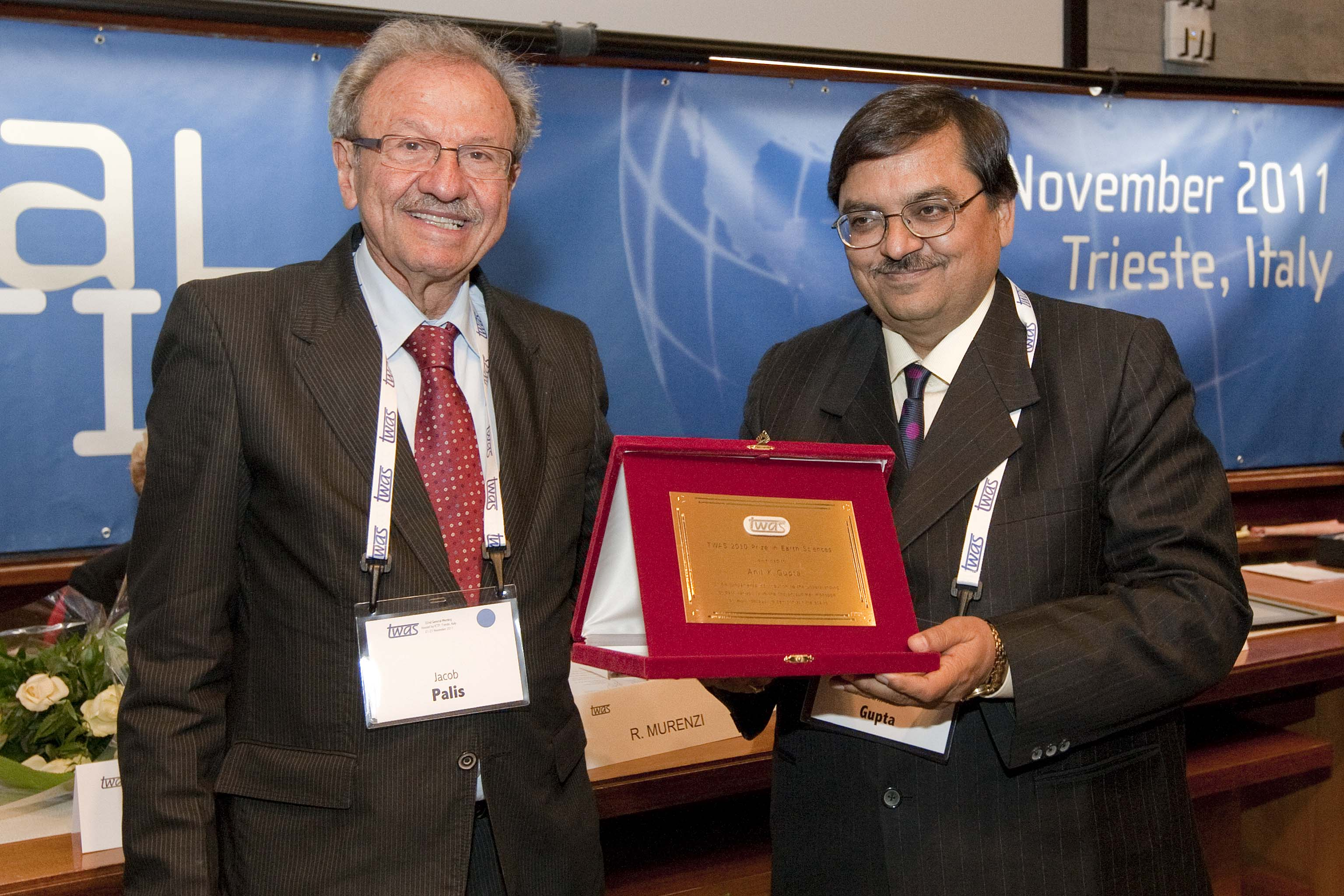
Anil Kumar Gupta receiving TWAS Prize 2010 from The World Academy of Sciences

Gupta received the Young Scientist award from the Indian Science Congress Association (ISCA) in 1990. He was awarded a fellowship from the Japan Society for the Promotion of Science (JSPS) to conduct research at Shimane University. In 2001, the National Research Council (NRC) awarded him a Senior Research Fellowship Award to work at the National Oceanic and Atmospheric Administration (NOAA) Laboratory in Boulder, Colorado. Gupta received the TWAS Prize from the World Academy of Sciences (TWAS) in 2010. He was granted the J.C. Bose National Fellowship by the Indian Department of Science and Technology (DST).

His honors and achievements include being

- Elected as Fellow of the Indian Academy of Sciences, Bangalore (FASc), India, 2008.
- Awarded the UNESCO-TWAS Prize of The World Academy of Sciences, Italy, 2010.

== Research ==
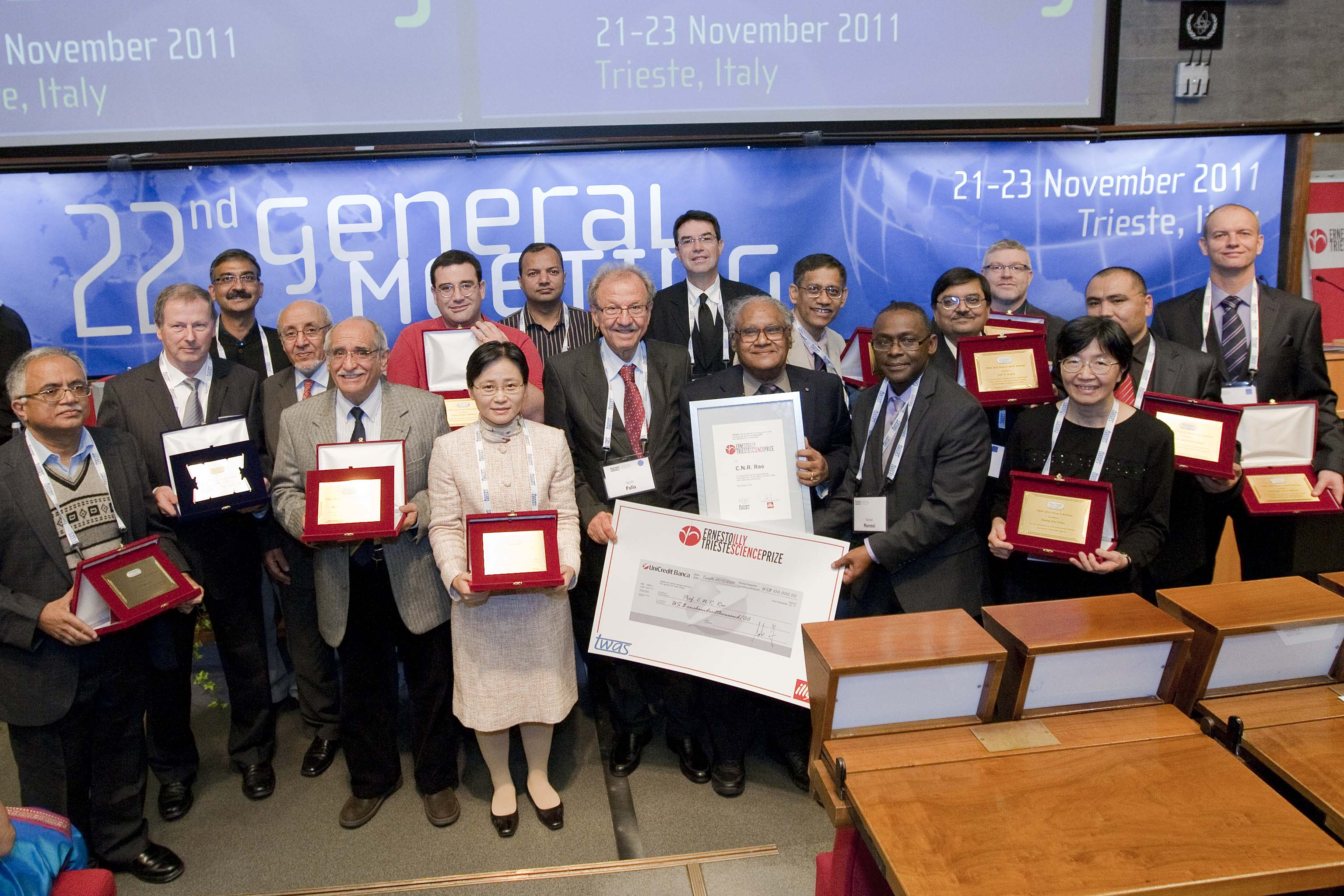
Gupta at the 22nd annual meeting of The World Academy of Sciences in Trieste, Italy

Gupta has contributed to the fields of micropaleontology, paleoclimatology, and paleoceanography, with a focus on the Indian monsoon system. He assisted in the publication of the Inventory of Glacial Lakes of Uttarakhand.

Gupta's work focuses on decadal to millennial-scale changes in the South Asian and Indian monsoon systems and their teleconnections with climatic shifts in the North Atlantic. His research is based on proxy records from the Arabian Sea, the Indian Himalaya, and the Ganges Basin. He and his team have studied foraminifera microfossils from the Arabian Sea to identify both short- and long-term shifts in the South Asian and Indian monsoons during the Quaternary. His work links Asian and Indian monsoon failures to societal collapses, human migrations, and changes in agricultural practices in South Asia during the Holocene epoch. His recent studies from the Himalayan and Ganges Basin lakes have indicated a long arid phase between 4,350 and 2,900 years BP that led to the displacement of Indus settlements and a major change in agricultural practices, including land use patterns.

To understand the history of Indian monsoon variability, as well as changes in the Indian Ocean, Gupta has studied benthic and planktic foraminifera, as well as their stable isotopes from Ocean Drilling Program (ODP) cores. His research includes the first identification of the Indian Ocean Dipole in a paleoclimate record and the documentation of Bond cycles in the paleorecord of the Indian monsoon over the Holocene. To understand regional precipitation, Gupta studied lake deposits and cave carbonates (speleothems) across the Indian landmass. His work produced the longest speleothem record from India, which revealed major shifts in the intensity of the Indian monsoon.

== Books and publications ==
- Anderson, D.M., Overpeck, J.T., and Gupta, A.K., 2002. Increase in the Asian southwest monsoon during the past four centuries. Science, 297(5581), pp. 596–599.
- Gupta, A.K., Anderson, D.M., and Overpeck, J.T., 2003. Abrupt changes in the Asian southwest monsoon during the Holocene and their links to the North Atlantic Ocean. Nature, 421(6921), pp. 354–357.
- Gupta, A.K., 2008. Monsoons, Quaternary. In: Vivian Gronitz (Ed.), Encyclopedia of Paleoclimatology and Ancient Environments, Springer, Berlin Heidelberg New York, pp. 589–594.
- De, S., Sarkar, S., and Gupta, A.K., 2010. Orbital and suborbital variability in the equatorial Indian Ocean as recorded in sediments of the Maldives Ridge (ODP Hole 716A) during the past 444 ka. In: Clift, P.D., Tada, R., and Zheng, H. (Eds.), Monsoon Evolution and Tectonics – Climate Linkage in Asia, Geological Society of London, Special Publications, v. 342, pp. 17–27.
- Singh, V. S., Pandey, D.N., Gupta, A.K., and Ravindranath, N.H., 2010. Climate change impacts, mitigation and adaptation: science for generating policy options in Rajasthan, India. RSPCB Occasional Paper No. 2/2010, Rajasthan State Pollution Control Board, Jaipur, India, pp. 1–150.
- Bhambri, R., Mehta, M., Dobhal, D.P., and Gupta, A.K., 2015. Glacial Lake Inventory of Uttarakhand. Wadia Institute of Himalayan Geology, Dehradun, p. 78.
- Mehta, M., Dobhal, D.P., Shukla, T., and Gupta, A.K., 2016. Instability Processes triggered by heavy rain in the Garhwal region, Uttarakhand, India. Climate Change, Glacier Response, and Vegetation Dynamics in the Himalaya, Chapter 12, pp. 219–234.
- Jayankondam Perumal, R., Thakur, V.C., Vivek, J., Rao, P.S., and Gupta, A.K. Active Tectonics of Kumaon and Garhwal Himalaya (Springer Natural Hazards). Springer, 1st ed. (April 16, 2018).
- Mehta, M., Bhambri, R., Perumal, J., Srivastava, P., and Gupta, A.K., 2018. Uttarakhand Calamity: A Climate Revelation in the Bhagirathi River Valley Uttarakhand, India, Chapter 10. In: I. Pal and R. Shaw (Eds.), Disaster Risk Governance in India and Cross Cutting Issues, Disaster Risk Reduction, Springer Singapore.
- Cheng, H., Xu, Y., Dong, X., Zhao, J., Li, H., Baker, J., ... and Edwards, R.L. (2021). Onset and termination of Heinrich Stadial 4 and the underlying climate dynamics. Communications Earth & Environment, 2(1), p. 230.
- Dong, X., Kathayat, G., Rasmussen, S.O., Svensson, A., Severinghaus, J.P., Li, H., Sinha, A., Xu, Y., Zhang, H., Shi, Z., and Cai, Y., 2022. Coupled atmosphere-ice-ocean dynamics during Heinrich Stadial 2. Nature Communications, 13(1), pp. 1–14.
- Gupta, A.K., 2022. Neogene Deep Water Benthic Foraminifera from the Indian Ocean – A Monograph. Nova Publishers, USA.
- Kaushik, A., Gupta, A.K., Clemens, S.C., Kumar, P., Sanyal, P., Gupta, P., Jaiswal, M.K., Maurya, A.S., Sengupta, S., Sharma, R., and Pawar, R., 2023. Paleoclimatic reconstruction of northwest Himalaya since CE 475 using lake sediments from Tadag Taal, Kumaun, India. Paleogeography, Palaeoclimatology, Paleoecology, 619, p. 111544.
- Podder, R.S., Gupta, A.K., Clemens, S., Sanyal, P., and Panigrahi, M.K., 2024. Changes in the Indian Ocean surface hydrography driven by the seaway closure and monsoonal circulation since the late Oligocene. Global and Planetary Change, 232, p. 104335.
- Podder, R.S., Gupta, A.K., Sanyal, P., and Clemens, S., 2023. Changes in surface hydrography of the western equatorial Indian Ocean during the Pleistocene: Implications for East African climate variability. Global and Planetary Change, 231, p. 104322.
- Mohanty, R.N., Clemens, S. C., and Gupta, A.K. (2024). Dynamic shifts in the southern Benguela upwelling system since the latest Miocene. Earth and Planetary Science Letters, 637, p. 118729.
- Gupta, A K., 2025. Shri Ram: The Most Virtuous Scion of Ikshvaku, Garuda Prakashan Pvt. Ltd., India, pp. 1–272.
