= Hartmut Heinrich =

German marine geologist and climatologist

Hartmut Heinrich (born 5 March 1952 in Northeim, Lower Saxony) is a German marine geologist and climatologist. Heinrich was Head of the Marine Physics Department at the Federal Maritime and Hydrographic Agency (BSH) in Hamburg until September 2017. He was actively involved in global Argo Ocean Observing Programme, environmental research and administration, and adaptation to climate change. In 1988 he described the suddenly occurring climate changes in the history of the Earth, which have since been named after him, Heinrich events.

Since October 2017 he is freelancer (10°E maritime consulting) for climate and environment. In October 2017 the Free and Hanseatic City honoured his important contribution to climatic research with the title "Professor honoris causa".

Heinrich studied geology at the University of Göttingen and attained a doctorate at the University of Kiel in marine geology. The discovery that was named for him, Heinrich events, periods of substantial ice output of the continental ice sheets by which the global climate is strongly affected, were subsequently confirmed by investigations of ice core samples from the Greenland ice sheet by the Greenland ice core project (GRIP). Heinrich warns of the consequences of global warming that could occur precipitously and of far larger effects on navigation, coastal populations and the marine environment.

== Selected publications ==
- Heinrich, H. (March 1988). "Origin and consequences of cyclic ice rafting in the northeast Atlantic Ocean during the past 130,000 years". Quaternary Research. 29 (2): 142–152. Bibcode:1988QuRes..29..142H. doi:10.1016/0033-5894(88)90057-9.
- Bond, G.C.; Heinrich, H.; Broecker, W.S.; Labeyrie, L.; McManus, J.; Andrews, J.; Huon, S.; Jantschik, R.; Clasen, S.; Simet, C.; Tedesco, K.; Klas, M.; Bonani, G.; Ivy, S. (19 November 1992). "Evidence for massive discharges of icebergs into the North Atlantic ocean during the last glacial period". Nature. 360 (6401): 245–9. doi:10.1038/360245a0.
