= Bond event =

North Atlantic ice rafting events

Bond events are North Atlantic geological ice rafting events (rock, gravel and sand being moved on icebergs). Gerard C. Bond sought to link these to climate fluctuations in the Holocene. Eight such events have been identified. Bond events were previously believed to exhibit a roughly c. 1,500-year cycle, but the primary period of variability is now put at c. 1,000 years.

Gerard C. Bond of the Lamont–Doherty Earth Observatory, at Columbia University, was the lead author of the 1997 paper that postulated the theory of 1470-year climate cycles in the Late Pleistocene and the Holocene, mainly based on petrologic tracers of drift ice in the North Atlantic. However, more recent work at a single site suggested that the tracers did not provide sufficient support for 1,500-year intervals of climate change and suggested that the reported c. 1,500 ± 500-year period was a statistical artifact.

Furthermore, after the publication of the Greenland Ice Core Chronology 2005 (GICC05) for the North Greenland Ice Core Project ice core, it became clear that Dansgaard–Oeschger events also show no such pattern. The North Atlantic ice-rafting events happen to correlate with episodes of lowered lake levels in the Mid-Atlantic region of the United States, the weakest events of the Asian monsoon for at least the past 9,000 years and also with most aridification events in the Middle East for the past 55,000 years (both Heinrich and Bond events).

== List ==
Overview of Bond events

Most Bond events do not have a clear climate signal; some correspond to periods of cooling, but others are coincident with aridification in some regions. Gaps between events have been estimated to be 1,000–1,500 years, with Bond event # 4 as an outlying data point.

| No | Time (BP) | Time (AD, BC) | Gap from previous event | Notes |
|---|---|---|---|---|
| 0 | ≈ −0.5 ka | ≈ 1500 AD | 900 years | See Little Ice Age |
| 1 | ≈ −1.4 ka | ≈ 600 AD | 1400 years | See Migration Period and Late Antique Little Ice Age |
| 2 | ≈ −2.8 ka | ≈ 800 BC | 1400 years | See Iron Age Cold Epoch |
| 3 | ≈ −4.2 ka | ≈ 2200 BC | 1700 years | See 4.2-kiloyear event; collapse of the Akkadian Empire and the end of the Egyptian Old Kingdom. |
| 4 | ≈ −5.9 ka | ≈ 3900 BC | 2300 years | Sahara desert reforms by 3500–3000 BC, ending the Neolithic Subpluvial. Piora Oscillation. Early Bronze Age begins ~3300 BC. |
| 5 | ≈ −8.2 ka | ≈ 6200 BC | 1200 years | See 8.2-kiloyear event |
| 6 | ≈ −9.4 ka | ≈ 7400 BC | 1100 years | Erdalen event of glacier activity in Norway, as well as a cold event in China. |
| 7 | ≈ −10.3 ka | ≈ 8300 BC | 800 years | |
| 8 | ≈ −11.1 ka | ≈ 9100 BC | — | Transition from the Younger Dryas to the Boreal. |

== Influence in regional climate ==
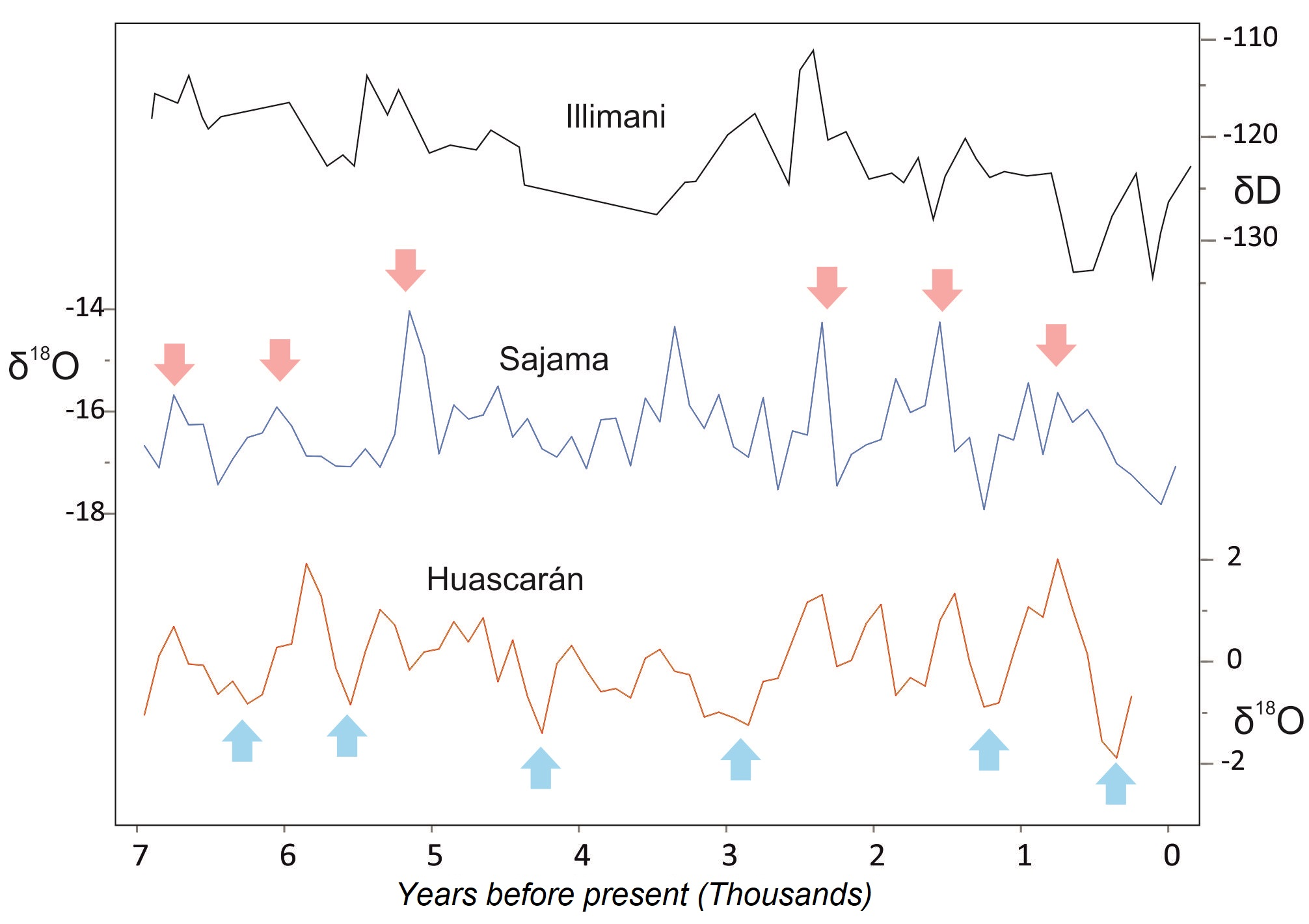
Holocene 18O and deuterium derived from ice records in Sajama, Huascarán and Illimani. Arrows showing the temperature drops that could be related to Bond events.

Bond events have been detected in remote regions such as the central Andes of South America. Up to six Bond cycles during the upper and middle Holocene have been identified in three ice core records of the tropical Andes. The records were extracted from the summits of Nevado Sajama, Nevado Huascarán, and Nevado Illimani. The detected cycles were at 6400 years Before Present (BP), 5500 years BP, 3700 years BP, 2700 years BP, 1300 years BP, and 200 years BP and represented temperature drops.

== See also ==
- Heinrich event
- Ice-sheet dynamics
