= Ice mélange =

Mixture of sea ice types, icebergs, and snow without a clearly defined floe

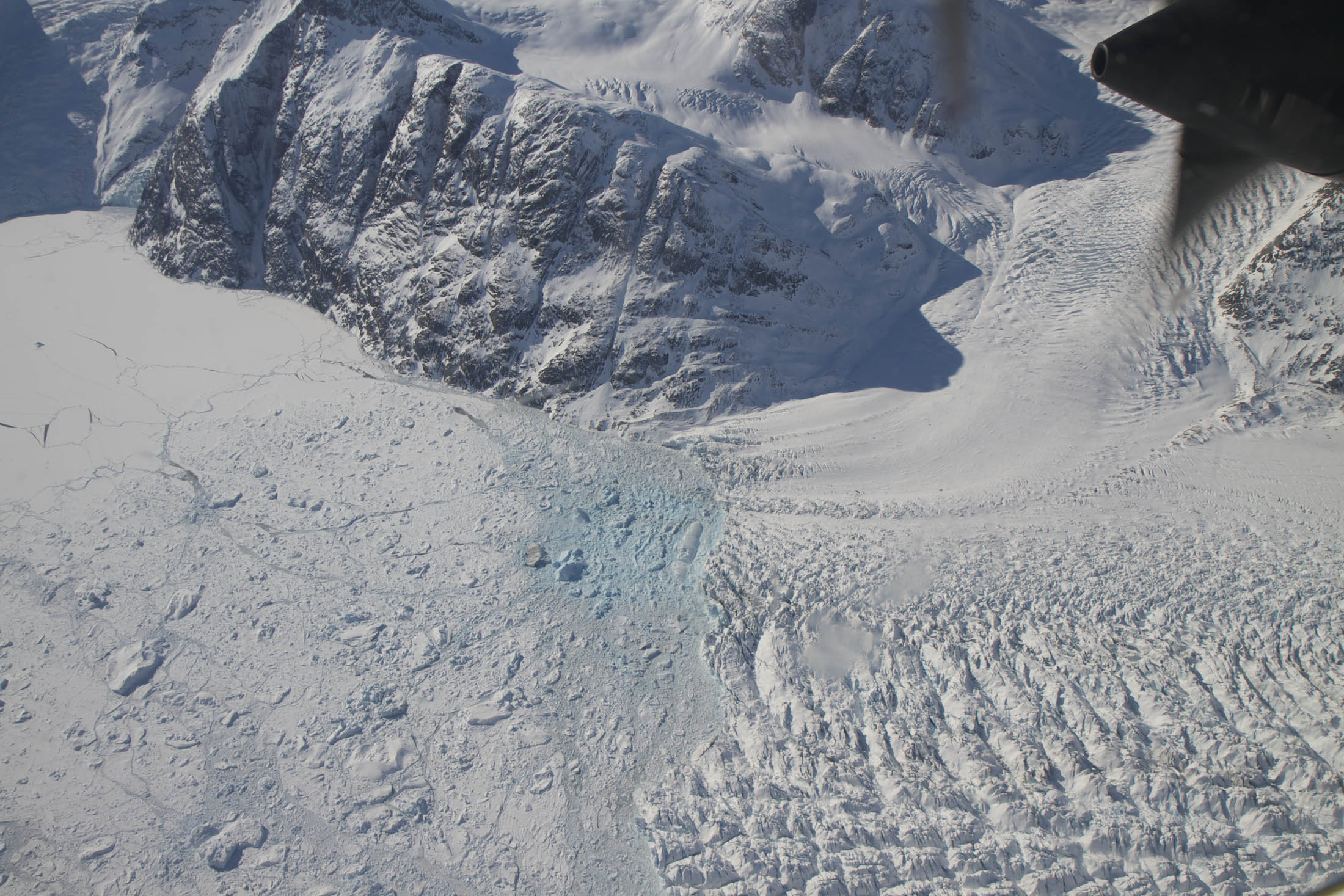
A Mélange of Ice - NASA Earth Observatory

Ice mélange refers to a mixture of sea ice types, icebergs, and snow without a clearly defined floe that forms from shearing and fracture at the ice front. Ice mélange is commonly the result of an ice calving event where ice breaks off the edge of a glacier. Ice mélange affects many of the Earth's processes including glacier calving, ocean wave generation and frequency, generation of seismic waves, atmosphere and ocean interactions, and tidewater glacier systems. Ice mélange is possibly the largest granular material on Earth, and is quasi-2-dimensional.

== Etymology ==
Mélange or melange means "mixture" and originates from the Old French word "meslance". Ice mélange has also been referred to as "sikkussaq" or "sikkusak", which is a Greenlandic word meaning packed by ice or surrounded by sea ice. The word is derived from the word "siku", which means sea ice.

== Influence on fjord seiches ==
Fjord seiches are created by the calving and capsize of large icebergs and mélange movement. It has been shown that such events create long-period, large-scale surface gravity waves and seiches. The presence of ice mélange slows down the propagation of both external and internal seiches and introduces band gaps where energy propagation (group velocity) vanishes. If energy is introduced into the fjord within the period range covered by a band gap, it will remain trapped as a fading oscillatory mode near its source, thus contributing to localized energy dissipation and ice mélange fragmentation. Understanding the connection between seiches and ice mélange is important for several reasons. First, seiches cause commotion within the mass of ice mélange that typically fills the fjord, thereby causing further break-up and capsize of the sea ice. Second, their relationship determines how the fjord will respond to forcing by the external ocean beyond. Third, seiches offer a means of quantifying the energy associated with iceberg calving and capsize, when direct local measurements of the event are impractical due to the hazards of deploying instruments on or below ice mélange.

== Examples ==
=== Jacobshavn Isbræ, Greenland ===
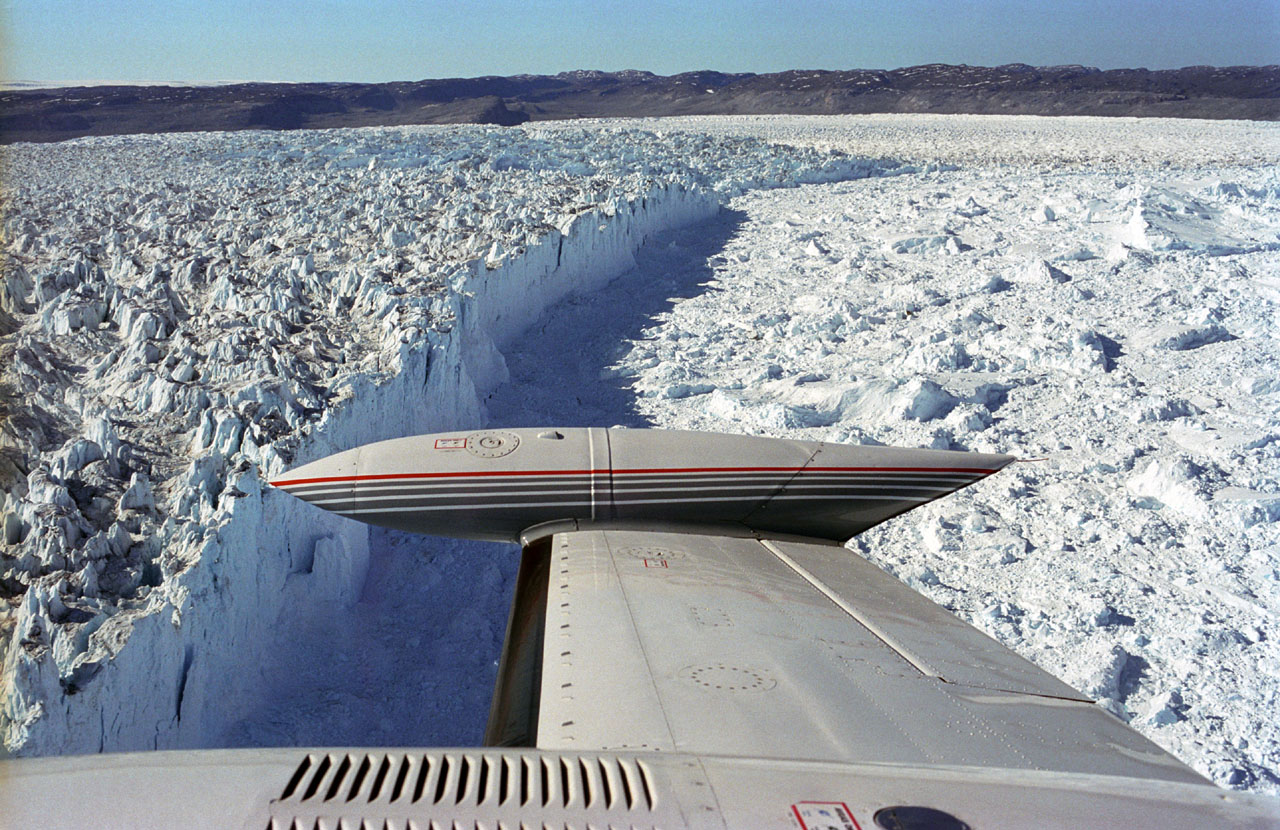
Huge icebergs and calved ice moving out of the Kangia to the sea.

The Jacobshavn Isbræ, or Jacobshavn Glacier, has a large drainage basin and is one of Greenland's largest and fastest-flowing outlet glaciers. Large calving produces a long floating ice tongue that rapidly melts in spring suggesting that the tongue is formed by a dense pack of calved icebergs and is an ice mélange. Through visual observations of Jacobshavn Isbræ's proglacial ice mélange it can be determined that the mélange forms a semirigid, viscoelastic cap over the innermost 15–20 km of the fjord, motion of the mélange is primarily contained by deformation within and along the margins of the mélange, and icebergs within the mélange gradually disperse and become isolated from each other as they move down the fjord. Seasonal variations in ice mélange strength can influence the evolution of Jacobshavn Isbræ's terminus position, and therefore glacier flow. Sea ice formation in winter solidifies the ice mélange and bonds icebergs and large ice masses, thereby increasing the mélange buttressing of the glacier terminus. Thus, sea ice and ice mélange act together to influence glacier breakup dynamics by preventing calving and enabling the terminus to advance. In addition to the rapid horizontal movement of the ice mélange during calving events, ocean waves generated by calving icebergs cause the mélange to experience vertical displacements.

=== Filchner-Ronne Ice Shelf, West Antarctica ===
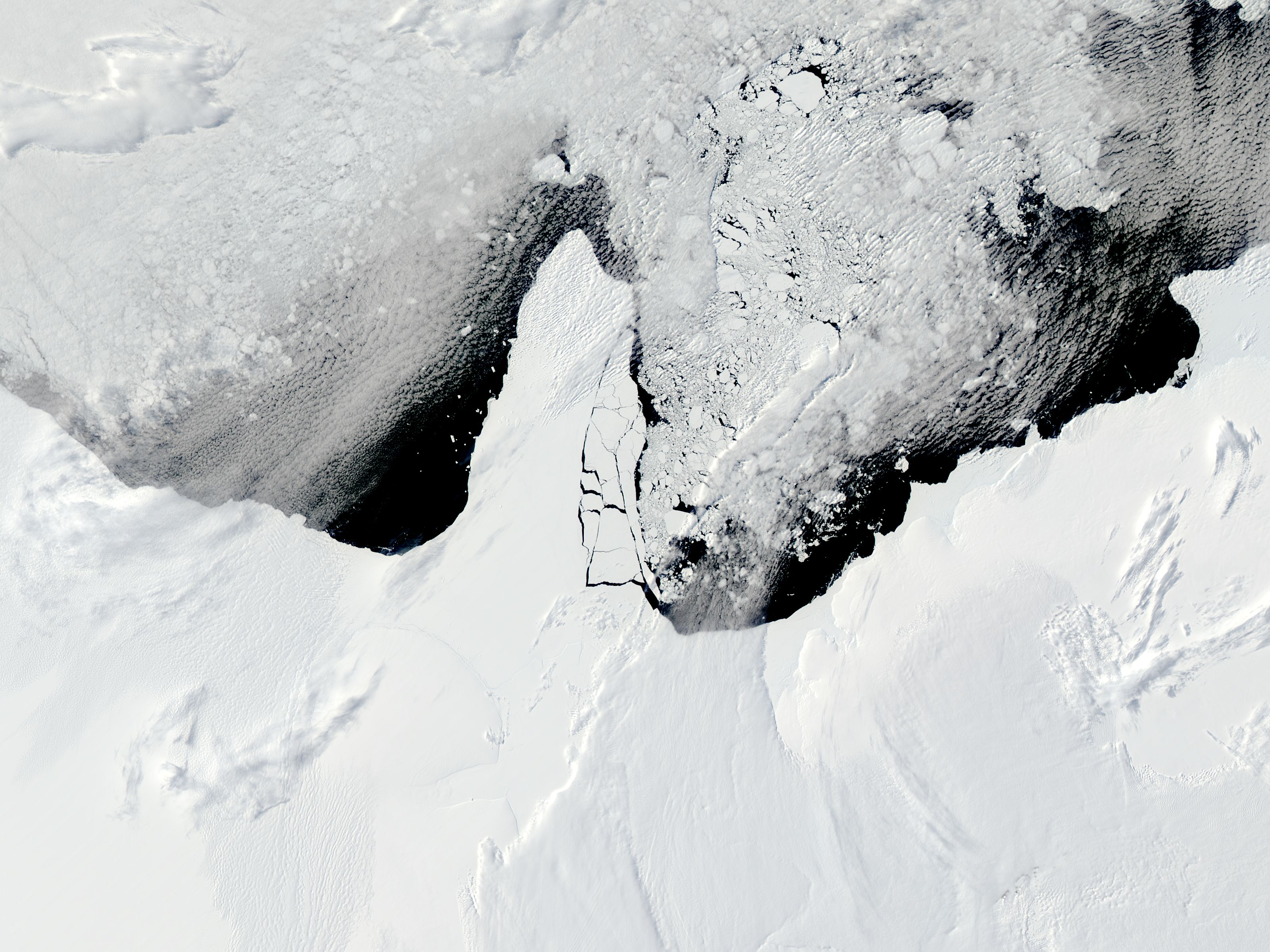
Rapid sea ice breakup along the Filchner-Ronne Ice Shelf

The Filchner-Ronne Ice Shelf The ice mélange at the boundary of the ice shelf has sufficient strength to trap large tabular ice-shelf fragments for several decades before the fragments eventually become icebergs. This mélange tends to deform coherently in response to the ice shelf flow and the deformation of sea ice within the rifts suggests that the sea ice binds together large tabular ice-shelf fragments. The motion of the tabular fragments is a rigid body rotation about a vertical axis that is driven by velocity shear within the mélange. The role of the rift-filling mélange may be to bind tabular ice-shelf fragments to the main ice shelf before they calve. This suggests two possible mechanisms by which climate could influence tabular iceberg calving. First, non-uniform distributions in oceanic and atmospheric temperature may determine where the mélange melts and, thus, the location of the iceberg-calving margin. Second, melting or weakening of ice mélange as a consequence of climate change could trigger a sudden or widespread release of tabular icebergs and lead to rapid ice-shelf disintegration. Ice-shelf rifting, a long-term process that culminates in tabular iceberg release, is strongly influenced by sea ice and other types of ice, which fill the rift. The eventual detachment of these fragments as icebergs thus appears to be determined in part by the dynamics of the mélange which fills rifts.

=== Brunt/Stancomb-Wills Ice Shelf, Antarctica ===
The Brunt Ice Shelf and Stancomb-Wills Glacier connection has been used to study ice shelf flow acceleration due to a change in the stiffness of the ice mélange area and examine the consequences of frontal rift propagation. The structure of the Brunt/Stancomb-Wills Ice Shelf is very heterogeneous and would be vulnerable to extreme fragmentation if the ice mélange dynamics were to rapidly change. However, currently the Brunt/Stancomb-Wills system is not endanger of extreme destabilization. In the Stancomb-Wills Ice Tongue sits two floating glaciers connected by a large expanse of ice mélange, roughly 6,000 km^{2} in surface area. Several Antarctic ice shelves, including Larsen D, Shackleton and West ice shelves, are held together by ice mélange. Khazendar et al. found that Brunt gives strong support to the general idea of ice mélange being able, at least partially, to fill ice shelf fracture, such as rifts and bottom crevasses, as well as larger expanses separating meteoric ice segments of an ice shelf and is an important factor in ice shelf stability.
