= Gerard C. Bond =

American geologist (1940–2005)

- Born: May 20, 1940; Altus, Oklahoma
- Died: June 29, 2005 (aged 65); Bronx, New York
- Education: Capital University (B.Sc.); U. of Alaska (M.Sc.); U. of Wisconsin (Ph.D.)
- Known for: Bond events
- Awards: Maurice Ewing Medal (2003)
- Scientific career
- Fields: Geology
- Doctoral advisor: Lewis M. Cline

Gerard Clark Bond (May 20, 1940 – June 29, 2005) was an American geologist.

== Biography ==
Bond received his Bachelor of Science degree at Capital University in Columbus, Ohio, where his father Ralph Bond was a Professor of Geology. He worked at the Lamont–Doherty Earth Observatory in Palisades, New York as Head of the Deep-Sea Sample Repository, after teaching briefly at Williams College in Williamstown, Massachusetts and the University of California, Davis. Bond theorized that variations in solar activity—the appearance of sunspots and changes in the emission of solar radiation—might be driving 1,500-year-cycles of amplified variability in northern hemisphere climate during the last glaciation, resulting in increases in iceberg discharges from the Laurentide Ice Sheet into the North Atlantic ocean, as evidenced by changes in the petrology of grains he extracted from deep sea cores covering this period. The cyclicity is also found during the Holocene, where the events are referred to as Bond events. Bond was awarded the Maurice Ewing Medal at the AGU Fall Meeting Honors Ceremony, December 2003.
