= Ice rafting =

Transport of various materials by drifting ice

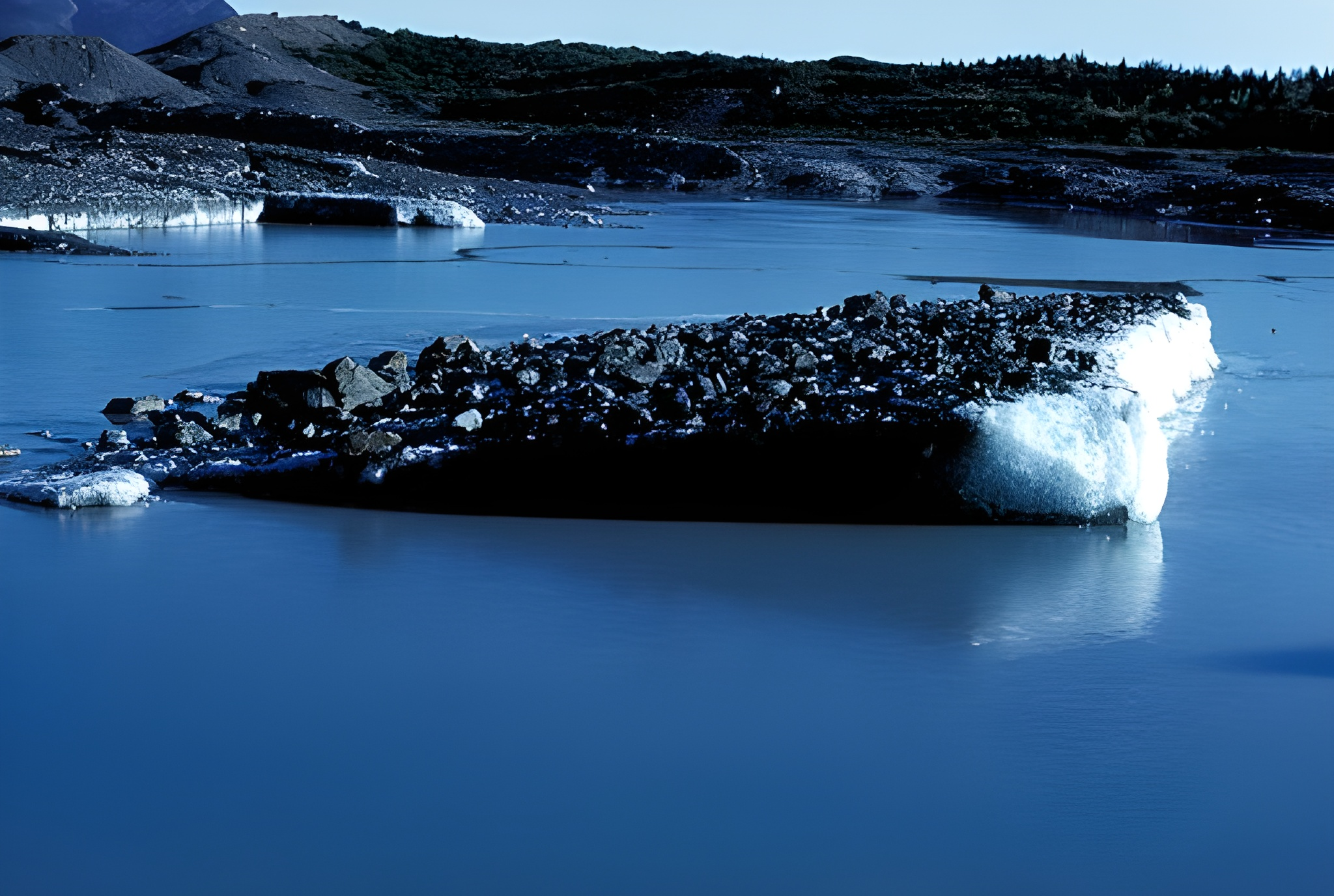
This debris-covered iceberg was calved from the terminus of Alaska's Sheridan Glacier.

Ice rafting is the transport of various materials by floating ice. Various objects deposited on ice may eventually become embedded in the ice. When the ice melts after a certain amount of drifting, these objects are deposited onto the bottom of the water body, e.g., onto a river bed or an ocean floor. These deposits are called ice rafted debris (IRD) or ice rafted deposits. Ice rafting was a primary mechanism of sediment transport during glacial episodes of the Pleistocene when sea levels were very low and much of the land was covered by large masses (sheets) of ice. The rafting of various size sediments into deeper ocean waters by icebergs became a rather important process. Ice rafting is still a process occurring today, although its impact is significantly less and much harder to gauge.

The melting of large icebergs deposits sediment of various sizes, usually referred to as glacial marine sediment, onto the shelf and deeper marine areas.

Ice rafting may be used for analysis of ice drift pattern by matching the rafted sediment with its origin.

Ice rafting must also be taken into an account in archaeology and as a possible cause of displacement of archaeological artifacts.

== See also ==
- Bond event
- Glacial debris
- Drift station, a facility built on an ice floe
- Dropstone
- Rafting event, the transport of living organisms to new areas over water on floating material
- Swallow float
- Glacial erratic
