= Proxy (climate) =

Preserved physical characteristics allowing reconstruction of past climatic conditions

Reconstructions of global temperature of the past 2000 years, using composite of different proxy methods

In the study of past climates ("paleoclimatology"), climate proxies are preserved physical, chemical, and even biological characteristics of the past that stand in for direct meteorological, climatological, and environmental measurements and enable scientists to reconstruct the climatic conditions over a longer fraction of the Earth's history. Reliable global records of climate only began in the 1880s, and proxies provide the only means for scientists to determine climatic patterns before record-keeping began.

A large number of climate proxies have been studied from a variety of geologic contexts. Examples of proxies include stable isotope measurements from ice cores, growth rates in tree rings, species composition of sub-fossil pollen in lake sediment or foraminifera in ocean sediments, temperature profiles of boreholes, and stable isotopes and mineralogy of corals and carbonate speleothems. In each case, the proxy indicator has been influenced by a particular seasonal climate parameter (e.g., summer temperature or monsoon intensity) at the time in which they were laid down or grew. Interpretation of climate proxies requires a range of ancillary studies, including calibration of the sensitivity of the proxy to climate and cross-verification among proxy indicators.

Proxies can be combined to produce temperature reconstructions longer than the instrumental temperature record and can inform discussions of global warming and climate history. The geographic distribution of proxy records, just like the instrumental record, is not at all uniform, with more records in the northern hemisphere.

== Proxies ==
In science, it is sometimes necessary to study a variable which cannot be measured directly. This can be done by "proxy methods," in which a variable which correlates with the variable of interest is measured, and then used to infer the value of the variable of interest. Proxy methods are of particular use in the study of the past climate, beyond times when direct measurements of temperatures are available.

Most proxy records have to be calibrated against independent temperature measurements, or against a more directly calibrated proxy, during their period of overlap to estimate the relationship between temperature and the proxy. The longer history of the proxy is then used to reconstruct temperature from earlier periods.

=== Ice cores ===
==== Drilling ====
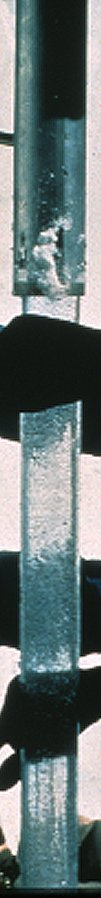
Ice Core sample taken from drill. Photo by Lonnie Thompson, Byrd Polar Research Center.

Ice cores are cylindrical samples from within ice sheets in the Greenland, Antarctic, and North American regions. First attempts of extraction occurred in 1956 as part of the International Geophysical Year. As original means of extraction, the U.S. Army's Cold Regions Research and Engineering Laboratory used an 80-foot (24 m)-long modified electrodrill in 1968 at Camp Century, Greenland, and Byrd Station, Antarctica. Their machinery could drill through 15–20 feet (4.6–6.1 m) of ice in 40–50 minutes. From 1300 to 3,000 feet (910 m) in depth, core samples were 4 1/4 inches (110 mm) in diameter and 10 to 20 feet (6.1 m) long. Deeper samples of 15 to 20 feet (6.1 m) long were not uncommon. Every subsequent drilling team improves their method with each new effort.

==== Proxy ====
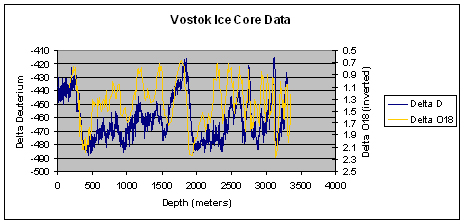
δ18O_{air} and δD_{ice} for Vostok, Antarctica ice core.

The ratio between the ^{16}O and ^{18}O water molecule isotopologues in an ice core helps determine past temperatures and snow accumulations. The heavier isotope (^{18}O) condenses more readily as temperatures decrease and falls more easily as precipitation, while the lighter isotope (^{16}O) needs colder conditions to precipitate. The farther north one needs to go to find elevated levels of the ^{18}O isotopologue, the warmer the period.

In addition to oxygen isotopes, water contains hydrogen isotopes – ^{1}H and ^{2}H, usually referred to as H and D (for deuterium) – that are also used for temperature proxies. Normally, ice cores from Greenland are analyzed for δ^{18}O and those from Antarctica for δ-deuterium. Those cores that analyze for both show a lack of agreement. (In the figure, δ^{18}O is for the trapped air, not the ice. δD is for the ice.)

Air bubbles in the ice, which contain trapped greenhouse gases such as carbon dioxide and methane, are also helpful in determining past climate changes.

From 1989 to 1992, the European Greenland Ice Core Drilling Project drilled in central Greenland at coordinates 72° 35' N, 37° 38' W. The ices in that core were 3840 years old at a depth of 770 m, 40,000 years old at 2521 m, and 200,000 years old or more at 3029 m bedrock. Ice cores in Antarctica can reveal the climate records for the past 650,000 years.

Location maps and a complete list of U.S. ice core drilling sites can be found on the website for the National Ice Core Laboratory.

=== Tree rings ===
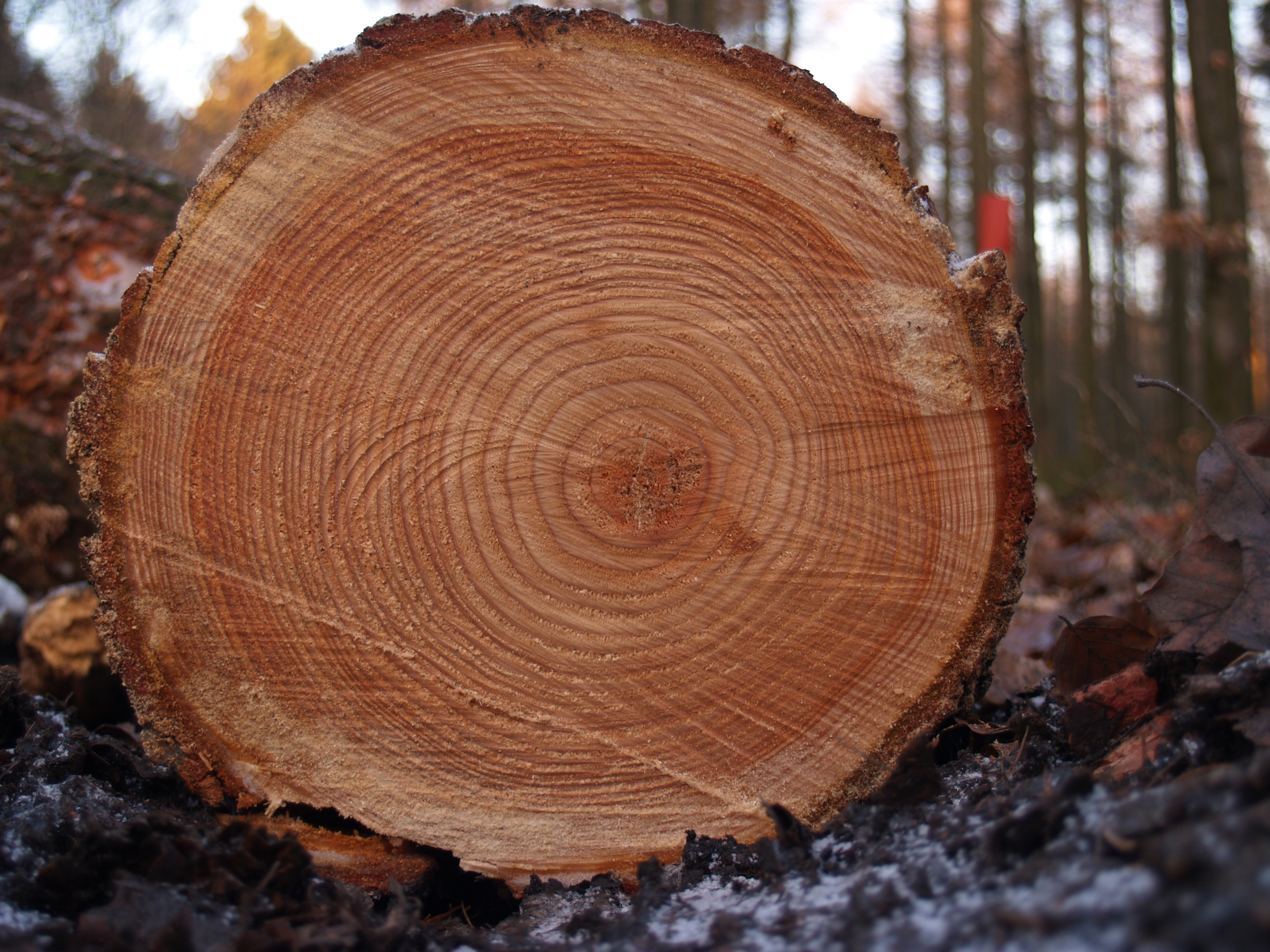
Tree rings seen in a cross section of a trunk of a tree.

Dendroclimatology is the science of determining past climates from trees, primarily from properties of the annual tree rings. Tree rings are wider when conditions favor growth, narrower when times are difficult. Two primary factors are temperature and humidity / water availability. Other properties of the annual rings, such as maximum latewood density (MXD) have been shown to be better proxies than simple ring width. Using tree rings, scientists have estimated many local climates for hundreds to thousands of years previous. By combining multiple tree-ring studies (sometimes with other climate proxy records), scientists have estimated past regional and global climates (see Temperature record of the past 1000 years).

=== Fossil leaves ===
Paleoclimatologists often use leaf teeth to reconstruct mean annual temperature in past climates, and they use leaf size as a proxy for mean annual precipitation. In the case of mean annual precipitation reconstructions, some researchers believe taphonomic processes cause smaller leaves to be overrepresented in the fossil record, which can bias reconstructions. However, recent research suggests that the leaf fossil record may not be significantly biased toward small leaves. New approaches retrieve data such as CO_{2} content of past atmospheres from fossil leaf stomata and isotope composition, measuring cellular CO_{2} concentrations. A 2014 study was able to use the carbon-13 isotope ratios to estimate the CO_{2} amounts of the past 400 million years, the findings hint at a higher climate sensitivity to CO_{2} concentrations.

=== Boreholes ===
Borehole temperatures are used as temperature proxies. Since heat transfer through the ground is slow, temperature measurements at a series of different depths down the borehole, adjusted for the effect of rising heat from inside the Earth, can be "inverted" (a mathematical formula to solve matrix equations) to produce a non-unique series of surface temperature values. The solution is "non-unique" because there are multiple possible surface temperature reconstructions that can produce the same borehole temperature profile. In addition, due to physical limitations, the reconstructions are inevitably "smeared", and become more smeared further back in time. When reconstructing temperatures around 1500 AD, boreholes have a temporal resolution of a few centuries. At the start of the 20th century, their resolution is a few decades; hence they do not provide a useful check on the instrumental temperature record. However, they are broadly comparable. These confirmations have given paleoclimatologists the confidence that they can measure the temperature of 500 years ago. This is concluded by a depth scale of about 492 feet (150 meters) to measure the temperatures from 100 years ago and 1,640 feet (500 meters) to measure the temperatures from 1,000 years ago.

Boreholes have a great advantage over many other proxies in that no calibration is required: they are actual temperatures. However, they record surface temperature not the near-surface temperature (1.5 meter) used for most "surface" weather observations. These can differ substantially under extreme conditions or when there is surface snow. In practice the effect on borehole temperature is believed to be generally small. A second source of error is contamination of the well by groundwater may affect the temperatures, since the water "carries" more modern temperatures with it. This effect is believed to be generally small, and more applicable at very humid sites. It does not apply in ice cores where the site remains frozen all year.

More than 600 boreholes, on all continents, have been used as proxies for reconstructing surface temperatures. The highest concentration of boreholes exist in North America and Europe. Their depths of drilling typically range from 200 to greater than 1,000 meters into the crust of the Earth or ice sheet.

A small number of boreholes have been drilled in the ice sheets; the purity of the ice there permits longer reconstructions. Central Greenland borehole temperatures show "a warming over the last 150 years of approximately 1°C ± 0.2°C preceded by a few centuries of cool conditions. Preceding this was a warm period centered around A.D. 1000, which was warmer than the late 20th century by approximately 1°C." A borehole in the Antarctica icecap shows that the "temperature at A.D. 1 [was] approximately 1°C warmer than the late 20th century".

Borehole temperatures in Greenland were responsible for an important revision to the isotopic temperature reconstruction, revealing that the former assumption that "spatial slope equals temporal slope" was incorrect.

=== Corals ===
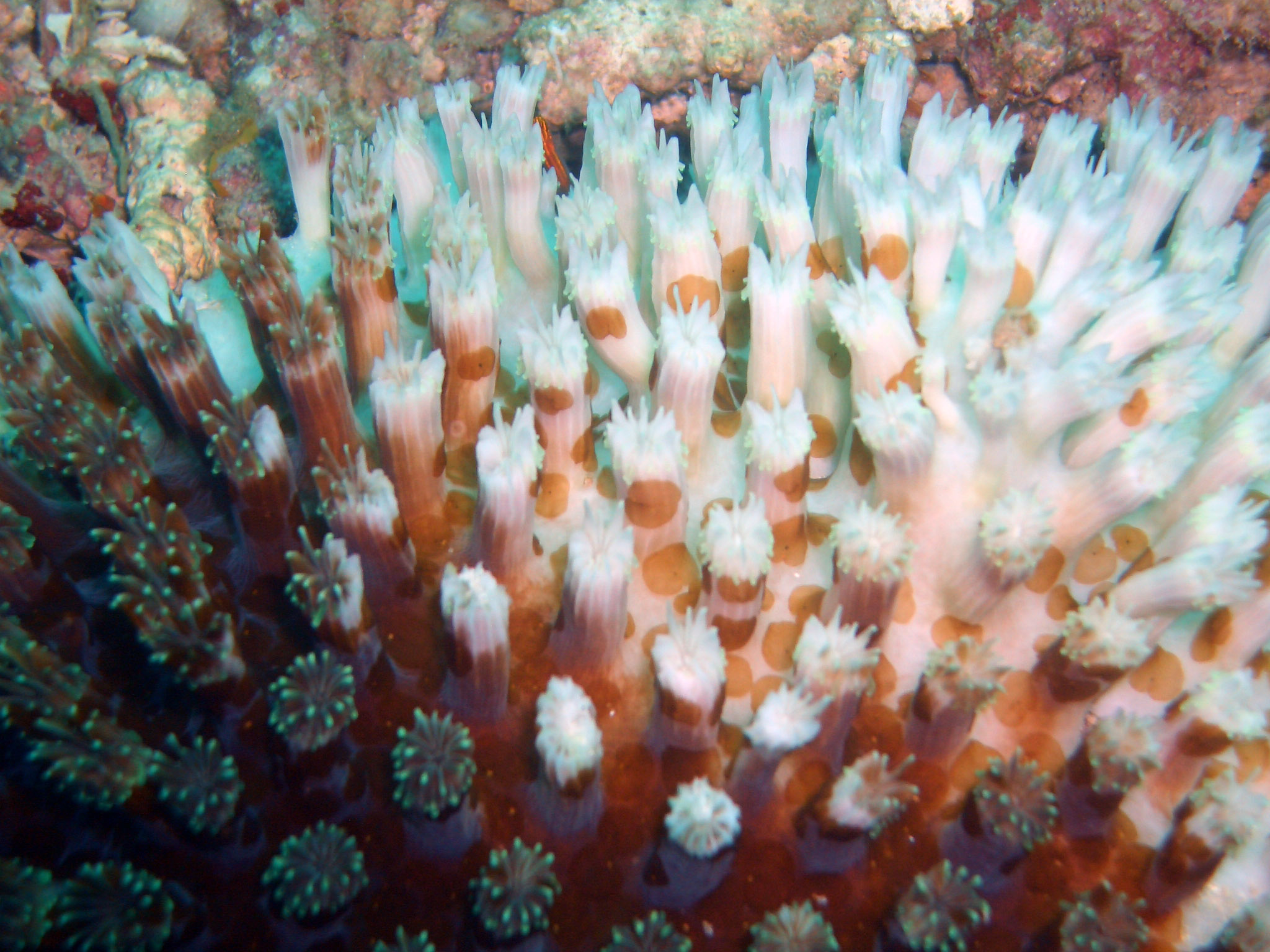
Coral bleached due to changes in ocean water properties

Ocean coral skeletal rings, or bands, also share paleoclimatological information, similarly to tree rings. In 2002, a report was published on the findings of Drs. Lisa Greer and Peter Swart, associates of University of Miami at the time, in regard to stable oxygen isotopes in the calcium carbonate of coral. Cooler temperatures tend to cause coral to use heavier isotopes in its structure, while warmer temperatures result in more normal oxygen isotopes being built into the coral structure. Denser water salinity also tends to contain the heavier isotope. Greer's coral sample from the Atlantic Ocean was taken in 1994 and dated back to 1935. Greer recalls her conclusions, "When we look at the averaged annual data from 1935 to about 1994, we see it has the shape of a sine wave. It is periodic and has a significant pattern of oxygen isotope composition that has a peak at about every twelve to fifteen years." Surface water temperatures have coincided by also peaking every twelve and a half years. However, since recording this temperature has only been practiced for the last fifty years, correlation between recorded water temperature and coral structure can only be drawn so far back.

=== Pollen grains ===
Pollen can be found in sediments. Plants produce pollen in large quantities and it is extremely resistant to decay. It is possible to identify a plant species from its pollen grain. The identified plant community of the area at the relative time from that sediment layer, will provide information about the climatic condition. The abundance of pollen of a given vegetation period or year depends partly on the weather conditions of the previous months, hence pollen density provides information on short-term climatic conditions. The study of prehistoric pollen is palynology.

=== Mammals ===
Rodent associations are recognized as a commonly useful biological proxy for inferring past local climate and environmental conditions, offering high spatiotemporal resolution over large geographical scales due to their frequent and widespread distribution in archaeological and paleontological sites, small home ranges, habitat specificity, high reproductive rates and rapid evolutionary rates. Advanced methodologies, such as combining the Bioclimatic Analysis approach with a spatial generalized linear mixed model, have been utilized to reconstruct continental-scale surface temperatures, including mean annual temperature (MAT), mean temperature of the warmest month (MTWA), and mean temperature of the coldest month (MTCO), across regions like the Western Palearctic for various past periods.

=== Dinoflagellate cysts ===
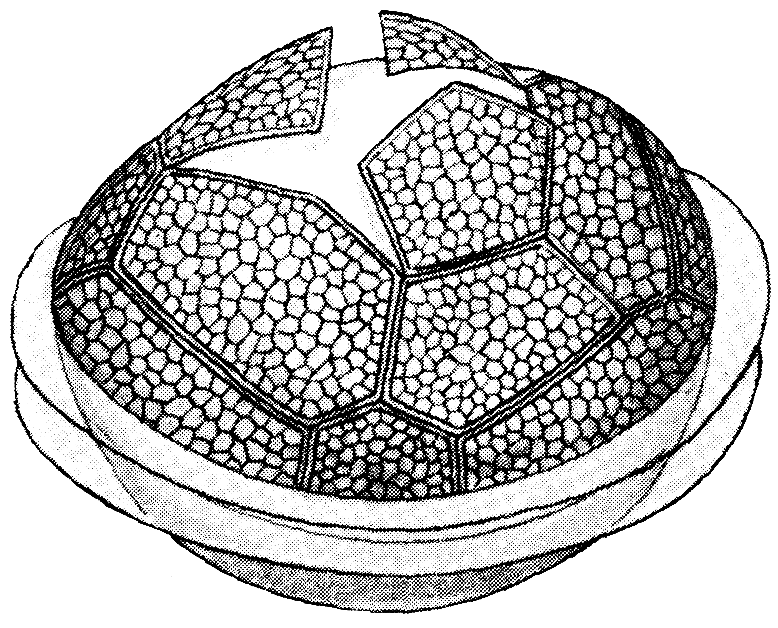
Cyst of a dinoflagellate Peridinium ovatum

Dinoflagellates occur in most aquatic environments and during their life cycle, some species produce highly resistant organic-walled cysts for a dormancy period when environmental conditions are not appropriate for growth. Their living depth is relatively shallow (dependent upon light penetration), and closely coupled to diatoms on which they feed. Their distribution patterns in surface waters are closely related to physical characteristics of the water bodies, and nearshore assemblages can also be distinguished from oceanic assemblages. The distribution of dinocysts in sediments has been relatively well documented and has contributed to understanding the average sea-surface conditions that determine the distribution pattern and abundances of the taxa. Several studies, including and have compiled box and gravity cores in the North Pacific analyzing them for palynological content to determine the distribution of dinocysts and their relationships with sea surface temperature, salinity, productivity and upwelling. Similarly, and use a box core at 576.5 m of water depth from 1992 in the central Santa Barbara Basin to determine oceanographic and climatic changes during the past 40 kyr in the area.

=== Lake and ocean sediments ===
Similar to their study on other proxies, paleoclimatologists examine oxygen isotopes in the contents of ocean sediments. Likewise, they measure the layers of varve (deposited fine and coarse silt or clay) laminating lake sediments. Lake varves are primarily influenced by:

- Summer temperature, which shows the energy available to melt seasonal snow and ice
- Winter snowfall, which determines the level of disturbance to sediments when melting occurs
- Rainfall

Diatoms, foraminifera, radiolarians, ostracods, and coccolithophores are examples of biotic proxies for lake and ocean conditions that are commonly used to reconstruct past climates. The distribution of the species of these and other aquatic creatures preserved in the sediments are useful proxies. The optimal conditions for species preserved in the sediment act as clues. Researchers use these clues to reveal what the climate and environment was like when the creatures died. The oxygen isotope ratios in their shells can also be used as proxies for temperature.

=== Water isotopes and temperature reconstruction ===
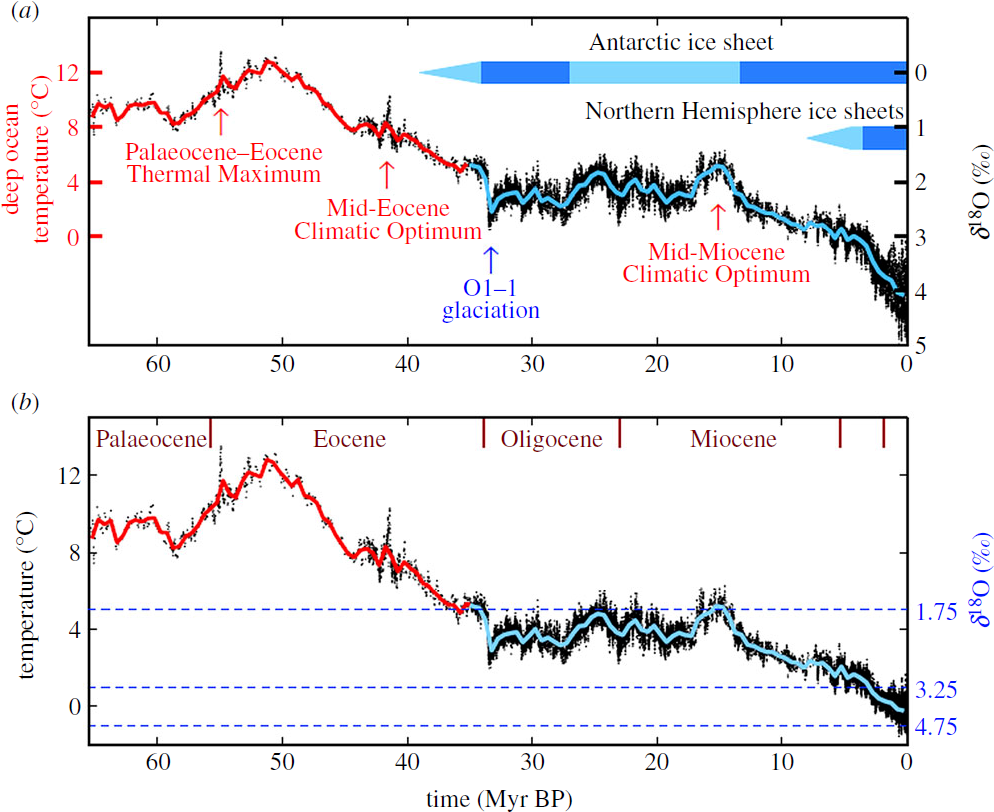

Ocean water is mostly H_{2}^{16}O, with small amounts of HD^{16}O and H_{2}^{18}O, where D denotes deuterium, i.e. hydrogen with an extra neutron. In Vienna Standard Mean Ocean Water (VSMOW) the ratio of D to H is 155.76×10^{−6} and O-18 to O-16 is 2005.2×10^{−6}. Isotope fractionation occurs during changes between condensed and vapour phases: the vapour pressure of heavier isotopes is lower, so vapour contains relatively more of the lighter isotopes and when the vapour condenses the precipitation preferentially contains heavier isotopes. The difference from VSMOW is expressed as δ^{18}O = 1000‰ $\times \left( \frac{([{}^{18}O]/[{}^{16}O])}{([{}^{18}O]/[{}^{16}O])_{\mathrm{VSMOW}}} - 1\right)$; and a similar formula for δD. δ values for precipitation are always negative. The major influence on δ is the difference between ocean temperatures where the moisture evaporated and the place where the final precipitation occurred; since ocean temperatures are relatively stable the δ value mostly reflects the temperature where precipitation occurs. Taking into account that the precipitation forms above the inversion layer, we are left with a linear relation:

δ ^{18}O = aT + b

This is empirically calibrated from measurements of temperature and δ as a = 0.67 ‰/°C for Greenland and 0.76 ‰/°C for East Antarctica. The calibration was initially done on the basis of spatial variations in temperature and it was assumed that this corresponded to temporal variations. More recently, borehole thermometry has shown that for glacial-interglacial variations, a = 0.33 ‰/°C, implying that glacial-interglacial temperature changes were twice as large as previously believed.

A study published in 2017 called the previous methodology to reconstruct paleo ocean temperatures 100 million years ago into question, suggesting it has been relatively stable during that time, much colder.

=== Membrane lipids ===
A novel climate proxy obtained from peat (lignites, ancient peat) and soils, membrane lipids known as glycerol dialkyl glycerol tetraether (GDGT) is helping to study paleo environmental factors, which control relative distribution of differently branched GDGT isomers. The study authors note, "These branched membrane lipids are produced by an as yet unknown group of anaerobic soil bacteria." As of 2018, there is a decade of research demonstrating that in mineral soils the degree of methylation of bacteria (brGDGTs), helps to calculate mean annual air temperatures. This proxy method was used to study the climate of the early Palaeogene, at the Cretaceous–Paleogene boundary, and researchers found that annual air temperatures, over land and at mid-latitude, averaged about 23–29 °C (± 4.7 °C), which is 5–10 °C higher than most previous findings.

=== Pseudoproxies ===
The forecast skill of algorithms used to combine proxy records into an overall hemispheric temperature reconstruction may be tested using a technique known as "pseudoproxies". In this method, output from a climate model is sampled at locations corresponding to the known proxy network, and the temperature record produced is compared to the (known) overall temperature of the model.

== See also ==
- Carbon dioxide in the atmosphere of Earth
- Dendrochronology
- Historical climatology, the study of climate over human history (as opposed to the Earth's)
- Ice core
- Karst, spelaeology
- Paleotempestology
- Paleothermometer
- Palynology
- Speleothem
