= WindSled =

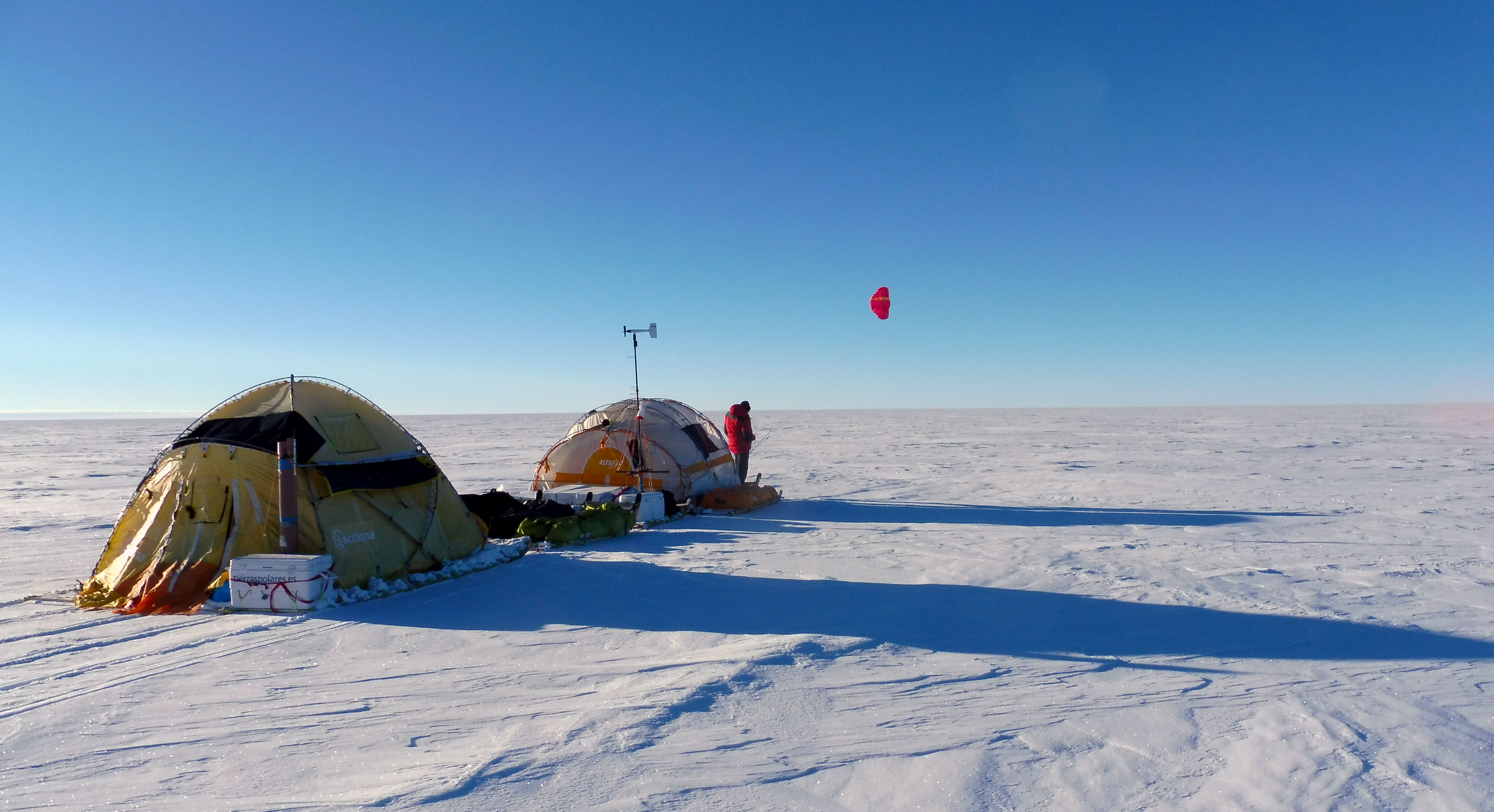
WindSled created by explorer Ramon Larramendi, in Ice River Expedition Greenland 2017.

The WindSled or Inuit WindSled is a wind-powered vehicle designed by Spanish polar explorer Ramón Hernando de Larramendi for travel and transportation of equipment in polar regions.

The vehicle is based on Inuit tradition, which Larramendi has combined with large kites so that it may progress through the interior of the Arctic and Antarctic plateau, driven by aeolian energy. It is able to transport up to 2,000 kg (4,400 lb) of weight. As of 2017, the vehicle has successfully covered more than 20,000 km (12,000 mi), driven only by the wind, reaching the Geographic South Pole, the South Pole of Inaccessibility and the highest altitude in the interior of Greenland. The Inuit WindSled has been improving for the last 18 years, during which it has served as a scientific platform for projects of different Spanish and international scientific institutions. Its purpose is to develop scientific and geographic exploration projects with zero emissions in polar regions.

== Layout ==
The Inuit WindSled is composed of four articulated modules, each of them made up with wooden rails and crossbars between 3 and 4.5 m (9.8 and 14.8 ft) in length and 3.7 to 4 m (12 to 13 ft) in width. This is the so-called 'Larramendi platform', the name of its designer. These rails and crossbars are joined by about 2,000 knots with high resistance ropes, which gives flexibility to adapt to irregularities in the terrain. In the lower part, it has Teflon platforms to facilitate sliding.

The first of the modules has a piloting tent where the kite controls are located, but it also has a work space. Next, two modules are attached for the load, and that's where all the equipment goes. The last module has another larger tent for crew rest. With this configuration, it can be divided into two vehicles when terrain and conditions require it.

The WindSled works with kites of different sizes, the largest of 80 m^{2} (860 sq ft), depending on wind conditions. Under normal conditions, its average speed is about 40 km/h (25 mph), although it has reached over 80 km/h (50 mph) in some moments.

It is equipped with photovoltaic panels for the electrical supply of the scientific and communications equipment it carries on board and all the composing parts can be repaired without the need of external assistance.

== History and evolution ==
After traveling more than 14,000 km (8,700 mi) through the Arctic, during the Circumpolar Expedition, Ramón H. de Larramendi learned the construction and handling of Inuit sleds and observed the force of the winds in polar territories. It was the germination of the WindSled project.

At the beginning of year 2000, he designed the first models of the vehicle and after performing several tests with fiberglass and wood, he found that the latter, following the Inuit tradition, was much more effective than more modern materials. That same year, he made a first crossing in Greenland of 600 km (370 mi) with an incipient design that consisted of a single module with a tent on top. Despite the difficulties, it was a success.

Since then the vehicle, which has been called "polar butterfly", "polar catamaran" and finally Inuit WindSled, has accomplished a total of six expeditions in Greenland and two in Antarctica, with a total distance covered of 20,000 km (12,000 mi), and all of them finalizing successfully. The first crossings in Greenland, in the years 2000, 2001, 2002 and 2003, strengthened the possibilities of the mobile platform on the polar terrain. It would obtain the '2001 Trip of the Year' Award from the Spanish Geographical Society.

Right after the 2005-2006 Transantarctic Expedition, the expedition decided to use the vehicle for polar scientific exploration, once possibilities of navigating with a heavy load were proven. In addition to serving for geographic exploration, scientific data could be collected on the crossings. With that objective, in 2012, after the Acciona Antarctica Expedition, a prototype of two modules was presented to the Spanish polar scientific community at the Autonomous University of Madrid. It was also presented to the scientific community in Great Britain.

During the 2014 and 2016 expeditions in Greenland, the WindSled designer developed new technical possibilities in two Arctic expeditions, increasing its dimensions. In 2014, the vehicle made the circumnavigation of Greenland by ice, a route of 4,300 km (2,700 mi) with a prototype of three modules in which four people traveled. In 2016, with the Greenland Ice Summit expedition, it became a convoy of four modules, with a total length of 12 m (39 ft), a maximum of six people on board in a journey to attain the 2,000 m (6,600 ft) level in altitude with two tons of weight. They covered 2,000 km (1,200 mi). It was confirmed that, even in extreme conditions, the WindSled was a sustainable and efficient means of transport. The last expedition, 2017 Greenland Ice River, took place in the spring of that year, with five crew on board. It took 28 days to cover 1,200 km (750 mi) and different international scientific projects related to climate change were developed in collaboration with the East Greenland Ice-Core Project (EastGRIP) scientific base at NEGIS, the Dark Snow Project and other relevant scientific institutions.

== Scientific research ==
In parallel to these external improvements, the interest of polar scientists has increased. Among the most relevant, the American glaciologist Jason Box, Geological Survey of Denmark and Greenland (GEUS), and the Spaniards, Antonio Quesada, Autonomous University of Madrid and Spanish Polar Program manager, Ignacio López Moreno, Pyrenean Institute of Ecology (CSIC) and Juan José Blanco, University of Alcalá.

With this vehicle drilling has been carried out in the interior of Greenland down to 15 m (49 ft), collected data on the state of snow, air samples and data concerning cosmic rays.

In 2016, the first scientific results of samples taken on the WindSled Acciona Antarctica expedition were published. An investigation, published in November in the scientific journal Atmospheric Environment, revealed the existence of persistent organic pollutants (POPs), from pesticides, in the interior of Antarctica. The main researchers were Jordi Dachs and Ana Cabrerizo, Institute of Environmental Diagnosis and Water Studies (IDAEA-CSIC).

In 2017, polar researcher Ross Edwards, with the international Dark Snow Project, participated as part of the expedition crew in Greenland, collecting data for the project.

== Expeditions ==
- Greenland Traverse 2000: 600 km (370 mi), 10 days.
- Greenland Traverse North-South 2001: 2,225 km (1,383 mi), 32 days.
- Greenland Traverse South-North 2002: 2,300 km (1,400 mi), 33 days.
- Greenland Traverse East-West 2003: 700 km (430 mi), 18 days.
- WindSled Trasantarctic Expedition 2005-2006: 4,500 km (2,800 mi), 62 days.
- Acciona WindPowered Antarctica 2011-2012: 3,500 km (2,200 mi), 38 days.
- Greenland Circumnavigation 2014: 4,300 km (2,700 mi), 49 days.
- Greenland Ice Summit Expedition 2016: 2,000 km (1,200 mi), 38 days.
- Ice River Greenland 2017: 2,000 km (1,200 mi), 28 days.
