= Stroeve =

Stroeve is a surname. Notable people with the surname include:

- Julienne Stroeve, American climatologist
- Roy Stroeve (born 1977), former professional footballer
