= Ramón Hernando de Larramendi =

Spanish polar explorer and adventure traveler (born 1965)

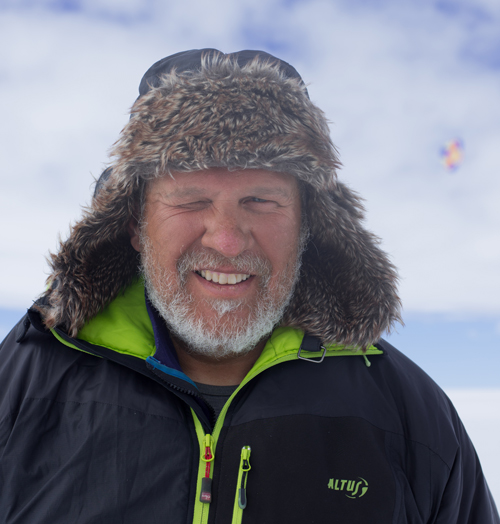
- Born: 1965 (age 60–61); Madrid, Spain
- Occupation: Polar explorer

Ramón Hernando de Larramendi (Madrid, 1965) is a Spanish polar explorer and adventure traveller who has promoted and developed a unique WindSled (also call Inuit WindSled), intended for the research in Antarctica and Greenland. He has traveled more than 40,000 km in polar territories.

One of his first milestones was the Circumpolar Expedition in the Arctic, during which he covered 14,000 km using only a dog sled and a kayak. This trip, which took three years to complete, laid the foundation for his later projects. In recent years, Larramendi has led a dozen expeditions in Antarctica and Greenland with his WindSled vehicle, whose ultimate goal is to be used for polar scientific research. Throughout his career, Larramendi has received several awards. An author of books on his experiences and on the Inuit, he has also been a member of RTVE's 'Al filo de lo imposible' ('Edge of the Impossible') team. He is currently a member of the board of directors of the Spanish Geographic Society. He lives part of the year in southern Greenland.

== The first years ==
In 1985, at the age of 19, Larramendi made the crossing of the Pyrenees on skis, from the Atlantic Ocean to the Mediterranean Sea, in 53 days, which he repeated in the following year on his own. Also in 1985, he was part of a pioneering group in Spain that crossed the interior of Iceland from west or east (Transislandia 85), also on skis, through its three largest glaciers. This feat allowed him to obtain his first public recognition: the Nescafé Prize 'Tu aventura vale un millón' ('Your adventure is worth a million'), in 1986, which let him finance his next adventure: the first Spanish voyage in the Greenland icecap: the TransGreenland Expedition, 700 km in 55 days. In 1988, he also led the first Circumnavigation of the Iberian Peninsula in kayak, sailing 3,500 kilometers in only 108 days. The following year, 1989, his adventurous spirit took him to the coast of Norway, which he travelled from north to south, another 2,500 kilometers, in kayak.

== The Circumpolar Expedition ==
In 1990, Larramendi embarked on a great adventure: the Circumpolar Expedition. For three years, from February 12, 1990, to March 25, 1993, he travelled 14,000 km, from Greenland to Alaska, through the Northwest Passage, a trip in which he only used dog sledding and kayaking. This adventure was published in the international edition of National Geographic, which consecrated him as an explorer on an international level. In this Circumpolar Expedition he reached the North Geomagnetic Pole at the age of 25 , thus becoming the youngest explorer in to do so. Throughout the journey, he had the opportunity to live with the Inuit, and to learn their language and their culture. For parts of the expedition he was accompanied by Manuel Olivera, Antonio Martínez and Rafael Peche.

== Greenland ==
Before the Circumpolar Expedition (1990-1993), Larramendi already knew Greenland. In 1986 he had been one of the key explorers in what would be the first Spanish expedition ever made to the polar ice cap: the Trans-Greenland Expedition, a route of 700 kilometers with skis that was carried out in 55 days.

In 1999, he began designing a wind-powered sled that is capable of moving through polar lands using large kites. In 2000, after a first test in Canada, he traveled back to Greenland with a first prototype of the vehicle to record a 600 km crossing for the TVE program 'Al filo de lo Imposible'. The following year, in 2001, he organized the Trans-Greenland Expedition 2001, a 2,225 km of route in only 32 days using a new prototype of the WindSled, then dubbed the 'polar catamaran'. On this journey, he broke the world record of distance travelled in just one day, and opened a new north–south route on the Arctic island (Narsaq-Qaanaaq).

In 2002, he returned to Greenland for a new windsled trip: a South-North traverse of Greenland, covering 2,300 kilometers in 33 days. He returned to Greenland in 2003 for another expedition: Greenland East-West, in which he traveled 700 km in 18 days.

In total, until August 2016, Larramendi hascarried out six expeditions with different designs of WindSled in Greenland. Of particular note is the one made in 2014, which was the first Circumnavigation of Greenland 2014 with a wind vehicle through the ice dome, with a total of 4,300 kilometers covered.

Also noteworthy was the one that took place from May 15 to June 25, 2016, after reaching the Greenland ice summit, located at 3,240 m altitude, carrying 2,000 kilos of load on a 2,000 km route that took 38 days. In the last two expeditions, data were collected for scientific projects from different Spanish institutions, all related to climate change in the Arctic. Also, Larramendi collaborated with a project of the American glaciologist Jason Box.

In addition to all these expeditions with the WindSled, Larramendi has carried out many other expeditions of shorter duration in the southern part of the ice cap and in the Thule region (northwest of Greenland), both with dog sledding and along the coast. During the years 1995 and 1996, the explorer spent two full winters in this region near the North Pole living and travelling with the Inuit. He has also accompanied mountain climber Jesus Calleja in his polar expeditions for different TVE programs.

== The Antarctic ==
=== Transantarctic 2005-2006 ===
In 2005, Larramendi travelled for the first time to the Antarctic, continent subject to an International Treaty, with his WindSled: The Transantarctic Expedition 2005–2006. It was the first crossing of history in this continent with a vehicle powered by renewable energies. He showed that, as in Greenland, it was possible to navigate the ice desert with a kite-driven vehicle. 'La Transantártica 2005-2006', in which he was accompanied by Juan Manuel Viu and Ignacio Oficialdegui, achieved an important global geographic milestone: the three Spaniards were the first in history to reach, on December 14, 2005, the Pole of Inaccessibility of the Southern Hemisphere, the most difficult point of access of the Antarctic continent because it is the furthest from the ocean, according to the new coordinates of the British Antarctic Survey. These coordinates differ by 100 km from those considered 'classic', reached by the Russians in 1958. In total, they travelled 4,500 kilometers in 62 days.

=== South Pole Without Limits ===
In 2009, Larramendi led the expedition 'South Pole without limits', the first one to include people with disabilities. In 12 days of crossing with skis and sleds, the expeditioners reached the Geographic South Pole without the aid of animals or engines after having travelled 250 km.

=== Acciona Windpowered Antarctic Expedition ===
Six years later from his previous expedition with the Wind Sled, in winter 2011–2012, Larramendi led the Acciona Windpowered Antarctic Expedition. It was the first time someone reached the South Geographic Pole (making 2,200 km in 18 days) with a vehicle powered by wind energy. In total, 3,500 km were covered in 34 days.

It was the first expedition of the explorer in which the vehicle was used for its original purpose: to explore and collect scientific samples for the French Institute of Glaciology and Geophysics of the CNRS-IJF in Grenoble, the Institute of Environmental Diagnosis and Water Quality of the Spanish National Research Council (CSIC) in Barcelona, and the Limnopolar group of the Department of Biology of the Autonomous University of Madrid. This adventure was awarded by the Spanish Geographic Society in 2012, in the Enterprise category.

Also participating in this expedition were Juan Pablo Albar, Javier Selva and Ignacio Oficialdegui.

== Other expeditions to the Arctic ==
=== Geographic North Pole ===
Since 1998, he began to collaborate with RTVE's program 'Al filo de lo imposible', with whose team he made an expedition on skis in which they reached the Magnetic North Pole. With the same program, in 1999 he participated in the first and only Spanish expedition in history that has arrived to the Geographic North Pole. They travelled 1,000 kilometers with skis from Siberia in 60 days.

== Projects ==
=== WindSled (Inuit WindSled) ===
The WindSled is a wind vehicle designed by Ramón Hernando de Larramendi with the aim of becoming a useful mobile platform for researchers dedicated to the scientific exploration of the polar lands, of which it has already covered more than 18,000 km.

It is a non-polluting means of transport powered by the strong polar winds, easy to carry and efficient in its performance. Its basic structure consists of several wooden platforms with crossbars and rails (following the model of the classic Inuit sleds), kites of different sizes and tents conceived as a space for habitability and work.

Since its first design in 1999, continuous improvements have been made to it through the about ten expeditions already organized by the explorer. The energetic supply of the platform comes from the wind and the sun, with comets and photovoltaic plates feeding the equipment. The current model consists of four modules and it's configured as a convoy of 10 to 15 meters in length by three wide, with capacity for six people and a load of 2,000 kilos. The project aims at launching an international and / or national scientific program in which the WindSled vehicle will operate as a mobile laboratory that generates zero emissions in the fragile polar ecosystems. At the beginning, it was named 'Polar catamaran', later 'Antarctic Butterfly' and finally Wind Sled.

=== Inuit Climate Change Patrol ===
Ramón H. Larramendi has launched a development project for the Thule region, in the northwest of Greenland, in which he combines his interest in preserving the traditional Inuit lifestyle with the research on the impact of climate change in this territory. The goal of the explorer is to help ensure that this threatened culture does not disappear.

=== Greenland Net Travel Agency ===
In 1997, the explorer founded the travel agency Greenland Net, a pioneer in organizing trips to the Polar Regions. It works in Spain, Italy and Greenland.

== Awards ==
- Nescafé Prize 'Tu aventura vale un millón'
- Travel Year 2001 Award, Spanish Geographic Society (‘Viaje del Año’ de 2001 de la Sociedad Geográfica Española).
- Enterprise 2012 Award (Acciona), Spanish Geographic Society.
- International Prize Feat MARCA DIARY
