= Lehning =

Lehning is a surname. Notable people with the surname include:

- Arthur Lehning (1899–2000), Dutch author, historian and anarchist
- Kyle Lehning, American record producer
- Michael Lehning (born 1967), German-Swiss geologist and atmospheric scientist
- Jason Lehning (born 1972) U.S.-American record producer and musician
- Shalee Lehning (born 1986), American basketballer
- Stéphane Lehning (born 1971) French footballer having played in the following clubs (US Vandœuvre Football - AS Nancy Lorraine - ESH - SAS Epinal)

== See also ==
- Lehninger
