= Peter Sinclair (environmental activist) =

American environmentalist (born 1953)

- Born: Midland, Michigan
- Education: B.F.A. at University of Michigan
- Occupations: Blogger, Videographer, Explorer

Peter Sinclair from Midland, Michigan (born 1953), is an environmental activist whose focus is on climate change. He is a YouTube blogger, explorer and founder of the ClimateCrocks.com website. Together with climate researchers he's traveled to hot spots of climate change, for instance to Greenland as part of the Dark Snow Project. Sinclair is perhaps best known for producing the Climate Denial Crock of the Week series on his YouTube channel. Videos have received praise from climate scientists such as Gavin Schmidt, Michael E. Mann, and the late Stephen Schneider. In 2012, he launched another YouTube series, entitled This is not Cool, for the Yale Project on Climate Change Communication.

== Life and work ==
Sinclair is the son of Mary P. Sinclair, He lives in Midland with his wife, Sandy, a teacher, and has stated that his concern about global warming results from concerns about the future of his children. He graduated from the University of Michigan at Ann Arbor with a Bachelor of Fine Arts. In the 90's he worked as a graphic artist, is the author of Alex's Restaurant, which was picked up by King Features Syndicate in 1990, after which it appeared in about 50 newspapers.

Sinclair has given a number of public speeches on climate change, such as one on January 23, 2013 at Michigan State University entitled The Ultimate Injustice. Sinclair gave another talk at the Ross School of Business on September 11, 2013, co-sponsored by the Erb Institute. The talk was entitled Communicating Climate Science in the Disinformation Era.

=== Interviews ===
For his videos, Sinclair regularly interviews climate scientists. He has also interviewed Marc Morano at the 2012 International Conference on Climate Change. Later that year, his video Welcome to the Rest of Our Lives was featured in Mother Jones. In January 2014, he posted an interview with Jeff Masters of Weather Underground addressing arguments about cold temperatures disproving global warming, which was covered by the National Journal.

== Expeditions ==
In 2012, he successfully crowd-funded via a Kickstarter campaign for an expedition with the climate researchers Jason Box and Maurio Pelto, to assess the state of glaciers around Mount Baker, an active glaciated stratovolcano.

In 2013, he went to Greenland with members of the Dark Snow Project and Bill McKibben, as their videographer, to document Greenland's surface melting.

== Awards and grants ==
- Herbert L. Munzel award for environmental activism from the Ann Arbor-based Ecology Center (2013).
- Climate Denial Crock of the Week won a competition for a $5000 grant from BrighterPlanet.com in 2010.
