= Pseudoproxy =

A pseudoproxy is a synthetic dataset used in paleoclimatology to test methods of reconstruction of global or hemispherical climate change from temperature records, developed for reconstructing the temperature record of the past 1000 years using proxies for periods before the instrumental temperature record. In May 2002 Michael E. Mann and Scott Rutherford published a paper introducing this method of adding artificial noise to actual temperature records or to climate model simulations to produce what they called "pseudoproxies". When the reconstruction algorithms were used with these pseudoproxies, the result was then compared with the original record or simulation to see how closely it had been reconstructed. They discussed the issue that regression methods of reconstruction tended to underestimate the amplitude of variation.
