= Mary P. Sinclair =

Anti-nuclear power activist

- Born: Mary Jean Palcich; September 23, 1918; Chisholm, Minnesota, U.S.
- Died: January 14, 2011 (aged 92); Northampton, Massachusetts United States
- Resting place: Midland, Michigan, U.S.
- Education: University of Michigan
- Occupations: Teacher, librarian, technical researcher, environmental activist
- Known for: Environmental activism
- Political party: Democratic
- Spouse: William D. Sinclair (1945–2001)
- Children: 5, including Peter Sinclair

Mary P. Sinclair (September 23, 1918 – January 14, 2011) was an American environmental activist and "one of the nation’s foremost lay authorities on nuclear energy and its impact on the natural and human environment".

== Early life ==
She was born Mary Jean Palcich, was raised in Chisholm, Minnesota, where she was high school valedictorian, then graduated from the College of St. Catherine in St. Paul, Minnesota. Subsequently, she was a teacher and editor for Chemical Industries magazine. She worked as a librarian at the Library of Congress in Washington, D.C., where she met and married William Sinclair in 1945. After his graduation from Georgetown University Law Center, the couple moved to his previous home town of Midland, Michigan. Mary took a job as a technical researcher at Dow Chemical Company, and the couple had five children. She also worked for the Atomic Energy Commission as a technical writer, abstracting research reports

== Activism ==
When Consumers Power announced their intentions to build the Palisades Nuclear Generating Station on the shoreline of Lake Michigan in 1967, Mary Sinclair's background in nuclear fission technology prompted her to write a letter to the editor that questioned the safety of several elements of their plan.

Soon after that, a nuclear plant was proposed to supply power for Dow Chemical in Midland, Michigan where she lived. Sinclair became more vocal in her opposition. She complained that important information was not being made public, and citizens had a right to know about the risks and problems that could affect their health and future. According to the Bentley Historical Library at the University of Michigan, her papers "illustrate how one individual's efforts can have a wide and far-reaching impact on environmental issues".

She published the paper Nuclear Power and Public Concern in 1970. The document posed questions about nuclear power risks to government experts, scientists and academic scholars, and detailed their responses. She debated nuclear power safety with a Consumers Power Company vice president in 1974. Public Broadcasting Service carried the show nationally, and the transcript was printed in the Michigan Education Association's publication, Teacher’s Voice.

Sinclair campaigned for the Michigan House of Representatives from the 102nd District in 1980, but was defeated in the general election.

Cracks in the containment building's foundation and sinking caused the Midland Nuclear Power Project to be abandoned in 1984 and a fossil-fueled plant was built instead. Sinclair turned her attention back to the problem of nuclear waste disposal and the federal government's failure to provide a comprehensive solution to the nuclear waste problem over several decades. In late 1992, The New York Times identified Sinclair as being "at the forefront of a battle...around the country, as utilities seek to build casks to hold the spent fuel" Nuclear plants were constructing 100-ton concrete-and-steel storage containers to hold nuclear waste on the same property where the reactors were located and close to large bodies of water. Sinclair and her network of activists wrote letters opposing this practice. She also testified at many public hearings on nuclear energy and authored numerous papers and articles.

== Repercussions ==
Dow Chemical is the largest employer in Midland, and her opposition to the high profile project considered important to Dow caused a backlash against Sinclair and her family. Their mailbox was blown up, they received threatening letters on their lawn, and were spat upon in public. Her husband's law practice was boycotted and the brake line on the family vehicle was cut. Still, Sinclair persevered. After the Midland reactor project was cancelled, a Consumers Power spokesperson commented; "I want to blame her but I don’t want to give her any credit."

== Higher education ==
Sinclair continued her education at the University of Michigan earning a Master's degree, then taught and lectured on Energy and the Environment at UM from 1973 to 1978. She entered the Doctorate program in 1988. Six years later, at age 75, she was named a Doctor of Philosophy in the field of Environmental communications; specifically resource policy and environmental education.

== Honors ==
In 1984, Sinclair was honored as one of 12 "Women of the Year" by Ms. Magazine. and she was one of the "Ten Michiganians of the Year" chosen by the Detroit News.

The CBS newsmagazine 60 Minutes profiled her on January 27, 1985, and in 1990, she was inducted into the Michigan Women's Hall of Fame.

She was selected as Michigan's “Environmental Women of Action” in 1992 in a program sponsored by Tambrands which recognized one woman from each state.

Her story was told in Mary Joy Breton's 2000 book Women Pioneers for the Environment, and the Catholic Church honored Sinclair and Helen Casey for their commitment to peace and the environment as "Jubilee Women" in 2000.

Other organizations that have recognized her environmental work include her alma mater the College of St. Catherine, Women Lawyers of Michigan, the New England Coalition on Nuclear Pollution, the American Ethical Union, and the Great Lakes Women’s Network Symposium on Women, Peace and the Environment.

== Death ==
Sinclair moved from Midland to Massachusetts in the late 2000s to be near her daughter, Rosemary. She died following a brief illness on January 14, 2011.
