= Ellen Mosley-Thompson =

American glaciologist and climatologist

- Education: Marshall University (BS); Ohio State University (MA, PhD)
- Spouse: Lonnie Thompson
- Awards: Fellow of the American Geophysical Union and American Association for the Advancement of Science
- Scientific career
- Fields: Paleoclimatology, Glaciology, Atmospheric Science
- Workplaces: Byrd Polar and Climate Research Center, Ohio State University
- Website: bpcrc.osu.edu/people/thompson.4

Ellen Mosley-Thompson is a glaciologist and climatologist. She is a distinguished university professor at Ohio State University and director of their Byrd Polar and Climate Research Center. She is known as a pioneer in the use of ice cores from the polar regions for paleoclimatic research and is an influential figure in climate science. She is an elected fellow of the American Association for the Advancement of Science, the American Geophysical Union and an elected member of the National Academy of Sciences.

== Early life and education ==
Mosley-Thompson was raised in West Virginia. She received a BS in Physics from Marshall University, where she was the only female student in the physics department. She went on to receive both her master's degree and her PhD in geography from Ohio State University, where she focused on climatology and atmospheric science. For her PhD, she interpreted the physical and chemical characteristics of a 100-meter-long ice core drilled at the South Pole in 1974; she compared the results to other cores drilled across the continent, which showed patterns in atmospheric conditions and temperature across Antarctica. With this early research, she demonstrated the importance of extracting high temporally resolved records for paleoclimate studies and, along with her husband and research partner, Lonnie Thompson, she pioneered the study of dust (particulate matter) in polar ice cores as a way to examine Earth's climate history.

In 1990, Mosley-Thompson joined the faculty of the Ohio State University. She became the director of their Byrd Polar and Climate Research Center in 2009.

== Career and impact ==
Mosley-Thompson is a specialist in paleoclimatology, abrupt climate changes, glacier retreat, Holocene climate variability, and contemporary climate change. Her research focuses on reconstructing climate indicators such as temperature, precipitation and atmospheric composition from the analysis of the physical and chemical properties preserved in ice cores from both Polar Regions as well as from many of Earth's highest mountain glaciers and ice caps in the lower-latitudes. The various chemical constituents are either deposited directly on the glacier surface or within the snow that falls and are eventually compacted into ice where they may be preserved over many millennia. These records provide unique information about the climate and environmental conditions prevailing when the snow was formed. Because the ice contained in some of these cores extend back hundreds of millennia, Mosley-Thompson, Thompson and their team are able to reconstruct parts of Earth's complex climate history. This research also contributes to the understanding of the impact of volcanic emissions on Earth's climate, as well as the chemical composition of the atmosphere. Mosley-Thompson's research provides evidence for past, abrupt climatic and environmental changes, and contributes to an understanding of possible climate futures and possible effects of climate change on human civilization.

Mosley-Thompson has led nine expeditions to Antarctica and six to Greenland to conduct this research. Her most recent expedition was the 6-person ice core drilling project on the Antarctic Peninsula's Bruce Plateau, for which she was field leader and Principal Investigator. This project was part of the larger National Science Foundation sponsored LARsen Ice Shelf System Antarctica (LARISSA) Project, a multidisciplinary, international effort to study the collapse of the Larsen A & B ice shelves and to contextualize their collapse within the history of climate change.

Mosley-Thompson has published over 137 peer-reviewed journal articles, and she has been the recipient of over 53 research grants. In 2010, The Guardian described Mosley-Thompson and her husband Lonnie Thompson two of the "world's most respected climatologists and glaciologists." The Franklin Institute describes the team as being "widely recognized as the world's preeminent experts in ice core sampling."

In addition to her research, Mosley-Thompson has served as president of AGU’s Atmospheric Sciences and Global Environmental Change Sections; chair of the AGU’s Paleoceanography and Paleoclimatology and GEC Sections’ Fellows Committees; chair of the Geology and Geography section of the American Association for the Advancement of Science; and as a member of the National Academy of Sciences’ U.S. National Committee for Quaternary Research and the Polar Research Board. She also works to increase the public's understanding of climate change and advocates for grassroots action on climate change.

== Awards and honors ==
Mosley-Thompson is an elected fellow of the American Association for the Advancement of Science and the American Geophysical Union. She also is an elected member of the National Academy of Sciences, the American Academy of Arts and Sciences, and the American Philosophical Society. She has received a number of awards, including the Benjamin Franklin Prize (2012), the Dan David Prize (2008), the Distinguished Explorer Award of the Roy Chapman Andrews Society (2007), and the Common Wealth Award for Science and Innovation (2002). In 2003, she was inducted into the Ohio Women's Hall of Fame. In 2021 she was awarded the BBVA Foundation Frontiers of Knowledge Award in the category "Climate Change" jointly with her husband Lonnie Thompson.

The Mosley-Thompson Cirques (Antarctica) located at 78º01´S; 161º28´E were named after her.
