= Anne Grunow =

American geologist

- Education: Wellesley College (BA Geology/Earth Science), Columbia University (M.Phil, Ph.D Geology/Earth Science)
- Occupations: Senior Research Scientist and Director of the Polar Rock Repository
- Years active: 1981–present
- Known for: Research on Antarctic tectonics
- Title: Dr.
- Website: https://www.researchgate.net/profile/Anne_Grunow

Anne Grunow is a senior research scientist at Ohio State University in the Byrd Polar Research Center. She is also the current director of the Polar Rock Repository. Grunow is a geologist specializing in Antarctic tectonics, with her research using methods from geochronology and paleomagnetism.

== Early life and education ==
During her undergraduate years at Wellesley College, Grunow developed a love of geology. Her attachment to the outdoors comes from her childhood when she lived and worked on the family farm. This aligned well with the extensive fieldwork that a geology degree required. Grunow graduated Absegami High School in 1977 and from Wellesley College in 1981. She then continued her education at Columbia University in New York City which marked the beginning of her travels to Antarctica in 1983. Grunow was the first woman to visit many of the remote West Antarctic outcrops in the Ellworth-Whitmore mountains, Thurston Island/Jones Mtns and Pine Island Bay. In 1989 she received her doctorate (PhD) in geology. Grunow worked under advisors Ian W.D. Dalziel and Dennis V. Kent on her dissertation entitled: Aspects of the evolution of the West Antarctic margin of Gondwanaland.

Following this, Grunow received a NATO Post Doctoral Fellowship from 1991 to 1993 at the University of Oxford. She later worked with Terry Wilson and Richard E. Hanson on the research paper: Gondwana assembly: The View from Southern Africa and East Gondwana. Their work was published in the Journal of Geodynamics in 1997.

== Career and research ==
In 1989, she started as a university postdoctoral fellow and then research scientist at Ohio State University in the Byrd Polar Research Center. Now a senior research scientist at Ohio State, she is also the director of the Polar Rock Repository. Her expertise includes geology and earth science, geochronology, tectonics, paleomagnetism, and polar geology. Her research centers on Antarctic Tectonics and she has led research teams to the Antarctic Peninsula and the Transantartic Mountains.

Some of Anne Grunow's most cited and notable work includes her research on Pan-African deformation and the potential links to the lapetus opening. This research centered around data collections dating back to the late Neoproterozoic era, and how they demonstrated a temporal correlation between Pan-African deformation and the Iapetus ocean basin closing. Another one of Grunow's most cited research paper was on the changing magmatic and tectonic styles along the paleo-Pacific margin of Gondwana and the onset of early Paleozoic magmatism in Antarctica. This research focused on the early Cambrian Period tectonics and its association with volcanic arc magmatism .

Her research has also been implemented in the Global Change Master Directory and published in Journal of Geophysical Research.

Her work was noted by the United States Antarctic Program, which commented on the benefit of her work and the Polar Rock Repository's ability to provide samples from Antarctica to a variety of scientific sources for study.

Grunow was also active in tectonics research of the Avalon Terrane in New England with Wellesley College mentor, Margaret Thompson. They have published many articles on the Boston Basin and its evolution in the late Neoproterozoic to early Cambrian. She also conducted research on Neoproterozoic rocks near Corumba, Brazil and Puerto Suarez, Bolivia. Results from this work with colleague Loren Babcock have been published.

=== Publications ===
- New paleomagnetic data from the Antarctic Peninsula and their tectonic implications
- The implications for Gondwana of new Ordovician paleomagnetic data from igneous rocks in southern Victoria Land, East Antarctica
- Pan-African deformation and the potential links to the lapetus opening
- The changing magmatic and tectonic styles along the paleo-Pacific margin of Gondwana and the onset of early Paleozoic magmatism in Antarctica
- Gondwana assembly: The view from Southern Africa and East Gondwana
- Magnetic Data from Subglacial Clasts, West Antarctic Ice Sheet

== Awards and honors ==
- Fellow of the Geological Society of America
- Chairman of the SCAR Antarctic Expert Group on Antarctic Geological Heritage and Geoconservation
- Nominated to the U.S Board on Geographic Names
- Antarctic peak named after her (Grunow Peak)
- Antarctic Service Medal
