= Mark Bowen (writer) =

American science writer

Mark Bowen (/ˈboʊən/ BOH-ən) is an American science writer.

He has written on the politicization of climate change and James Hansen. A biography of climate scientist Lonnie Thompson. The story of the Antarctic Muon And Neutrino Detector Array (AMANDA) and the IceCube Neutrino Observatory project in which Bowen was embedded.

He received a Ph.D. in physics from M.I.T. He is a rock-climber, and a mountain-climber who summited on Mount Kilimanjaro.

== Bibliography ==
- Thin Ice: Unlocking the Secrets of Climate in the World's Highest Mountains, 2005 ISBN 978-0805081350
- Censoring Science: Inside the Political Attack on Dr. James Hansen and the Truth of Global Warming, 2007 ISBN 978-0-525-95014-1
- The Telescope in the Ice: Inventing a New Astronomy at the South Pole, 2017 ISBN 978-1137280084
