= Sermeq Konrad Steffen =

Newly named glacier in North Greenland

- Location within Greenland
- Type: Ice sheet glacier
- Location: Northeast Greenland National Park Greenland
- Coordinates: 81°16′19″N 57°8′42″W
- Length: 20 km (12 mi)
- Terminus: Ocean
- Status: Retreating

== Description ==
Sermeq Konrad Steffen is a tidewater ice-sheet glacier in North Greenland. This means that it flows from the ice sheet into the ocean. It is 3 km wide and has an estimated annual iceberg production of three million tonnes per year. The glacier fills the upper reaches of an approximately 100 km long fjord that flows into Robeson Channel, between Ellesmere Island and Greenland, in the northwestern section of Northeast Greenland National Park. It is also located very close to the Greenland ice sheet's oldest surface exposure in nearby Warming Land, where surface ice ages are estimated to be >30,000 years old.

== Toponym ==
Sermeq Konrad Steffen is named after deceased glaciologist Konrad Steffen, in honor of his exceptional contributions to Greenland science and society. The Greenland Place Names Committee recognized that Steffen established and maintained a network of climate stations on the ice sheet and consistently highlighted the climate-change impacts confronting Greenland in the international media. In Greenlandic, "Sermeq" denotes both "glacier" and "ice sheet". The anglicized toponym is therefore "Glacier Konrad Steffen".

== Gallery ==
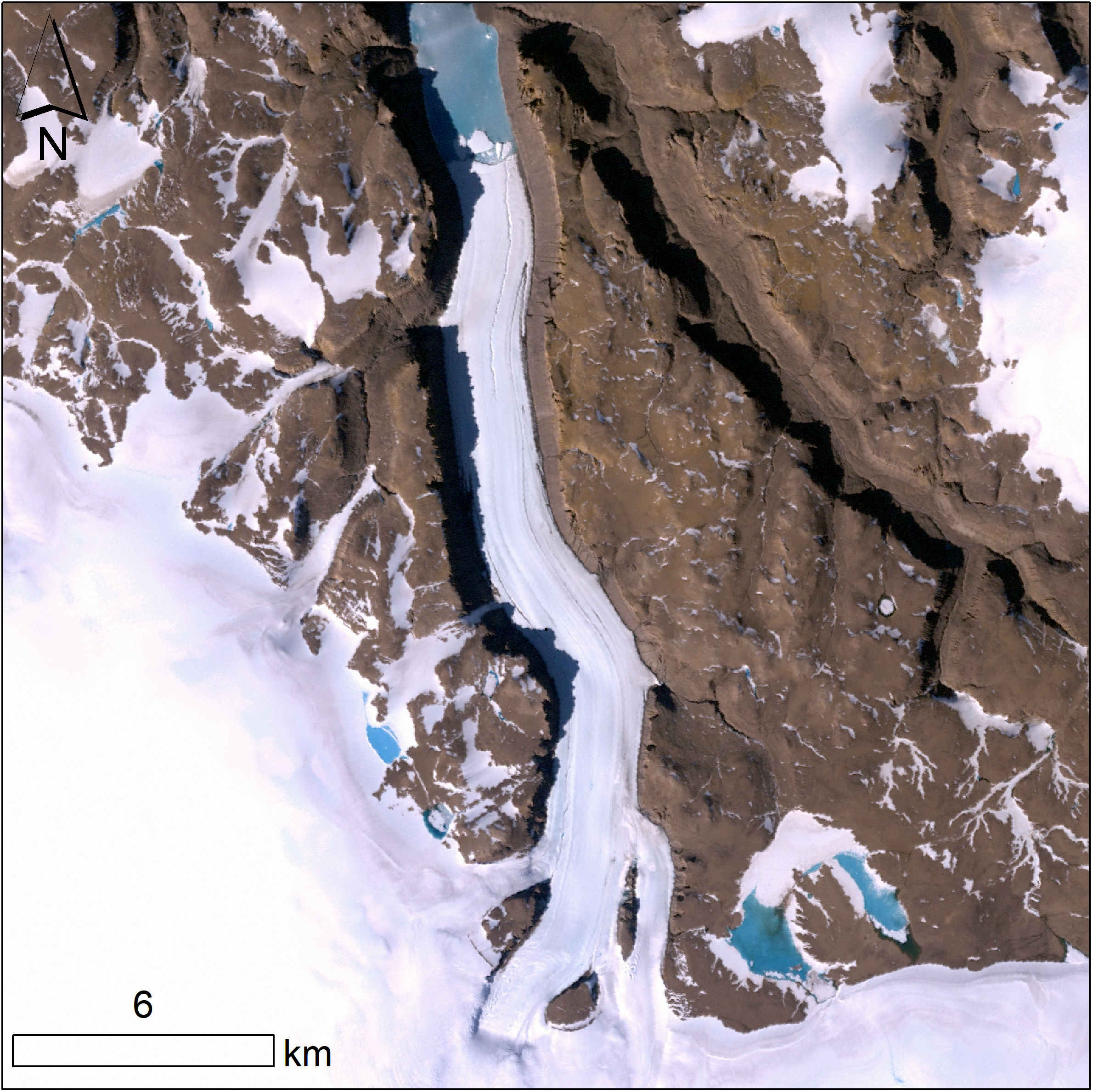
Satellite image of Sermeq Konrad Steffen, North Greenland, circa 1999-2002. This image is a subset of the Landsat-7 ETM+ mosaic of the Greenland Ice Mapping Project.

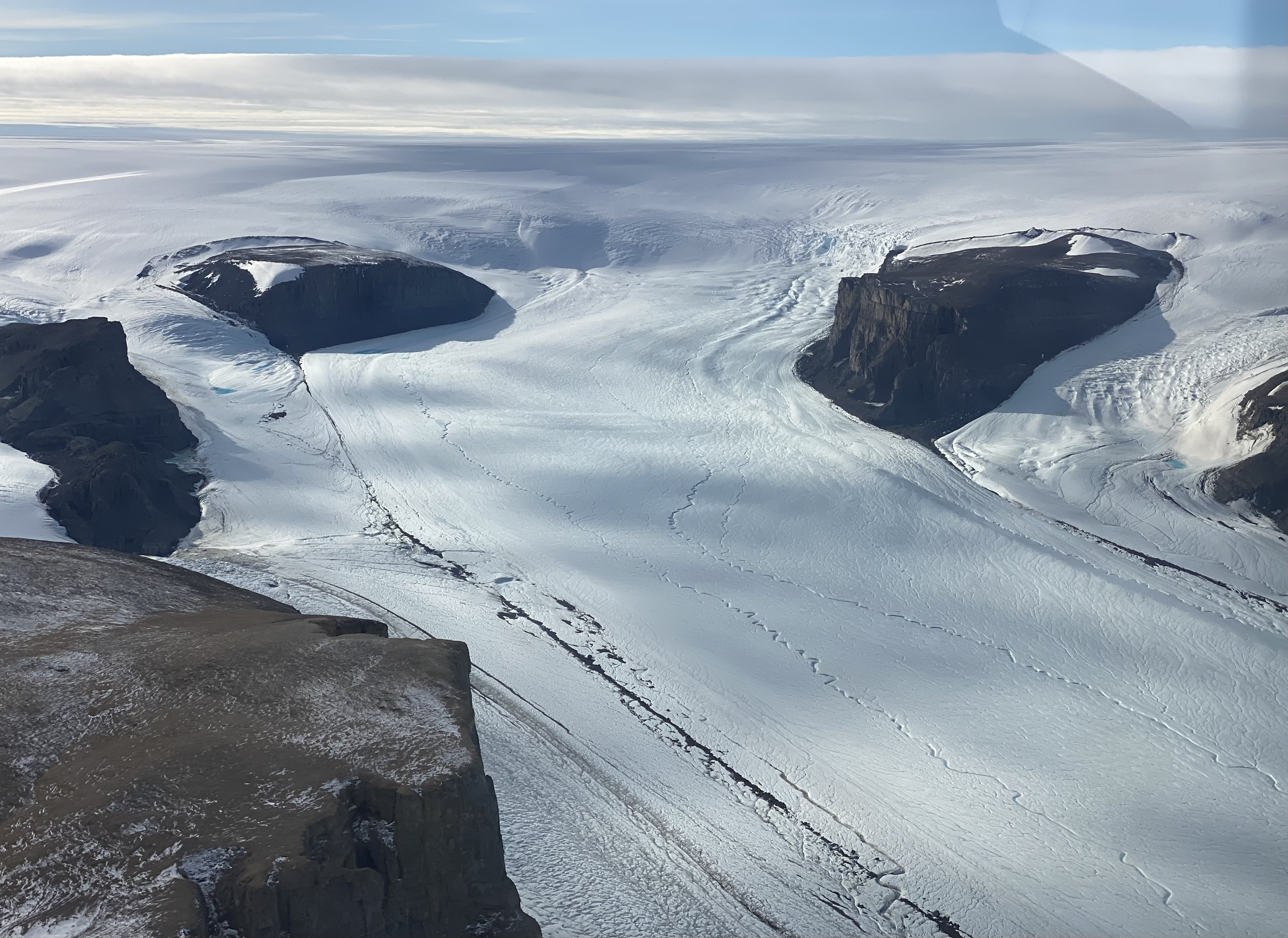
Oblique aerial photograph showing the icefalls and supraglacial streams of Sermeq Konrad Steffen in summer 2022. Photographed by Christiane Leister during the Leister Expedition Go North 2022. Available from the US National Snow and Ice Data Center's Glacier Photograph Collection.
