= Dark Snow Project =

Climate research project

The Dark Snow Project is a field and lab exploration to measure the impact of changing wildfire and industrial soot and snow microbes on snow and ice reflectivity.

== The project ==
Its initial goal was to raise funding to transport a research team to Greenland. The crowd funding campaign was successful. The funds were spent primarily on commercial air travel and chartering a helicopter to transport the team onto the Greenland ice sheet. One of its members, climatologist Jason Box, is a professor at the Geological Survey of Denmark and Greenland and used to work at the Byrd Polar and Climate Research Center. Peter Sinclair, a YouTube blogger from Midland, Michigan who makes global warming related videos, was invited to participate and ultimately was a powerful co-producer of the work.

Bill McKibben was to participate with the Greenland field team. McKibben ultimately could not make the trip. Rolling Stone magazine supported alternatively Jeff Goodell who wrote a magazine piece on Box's work and Dark Snow Project. Their project has been promoted on The Weather Channel. If they succeed in proving that the soot from wildfires contributed to the melting of the Greenland ice sheet, then Box intends to encourage wildfire management "through the indirect policy of greenhouse gas emission reduction." Once they reach Greenland, "Box hopes to drill into the inland ice sheet to examine the black carbon littering the layers of snow, in order to determine where it's coming from: tundra fires, exhaust from ships, or manufacturing dust from the continents, for example."

== Funding ==
Box originally asked for funding from the National Science Foundation's rapid funding program, but his request was turned down. As a result, the project has brought new attention to the concept of crowdfunding with regard to research projects. As Outside put it, "If it takes off, crowdfunded science could create a platform for more nimble, fast-paced research that isn't bogged down by bureaucracy."

== Results ==
In October 2014, the Dark Snow Project published a blog on some findings, and noted surprising dark surfaces of Greenland ice.

== Background ==
"Soot darkens snow and ice, increasing solar energy absorption, hastening the melt of the cryosphere." The soot comes in part from wildfires, of which there were many in 2012. Also in 2012, almost all of the surface of Greenland was observed to be melting. The increase in size of the wildfires may itself be a result of global warming.

== See also ==
- Ice–albedo feedback
