= Michael Lehning =

German geologist and atmospheric scientist

Professor Michael Lehning
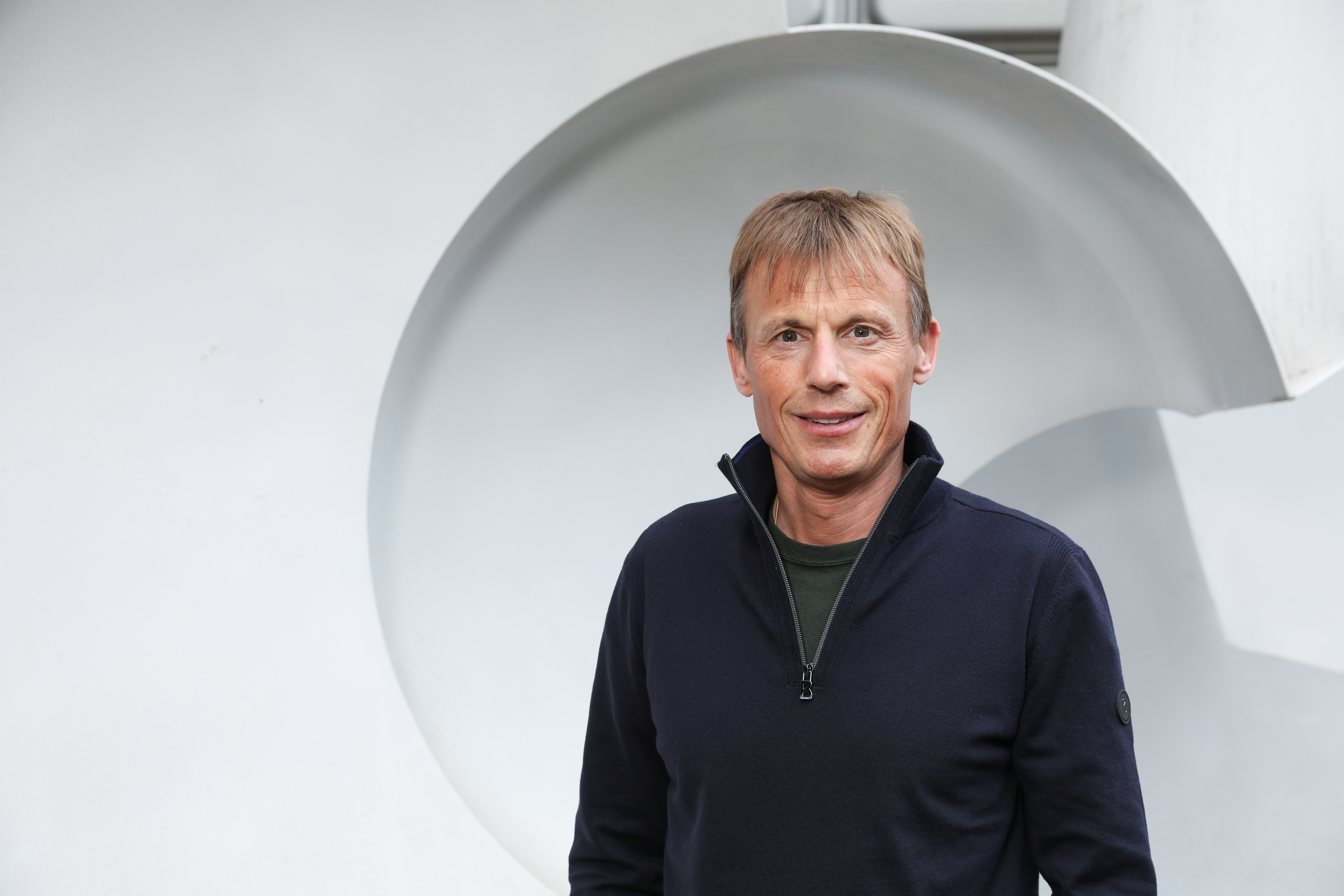
- Michael Lehning in 2021
- Born: 1967 (age 58–59)
- Known for: Snow dynamics and modelling Wind and solar energy from mountains Snow deposition and precipitation

Academic background
- Education: University of Bayreuth; University of California, Davis; ETH Zurich
- Thesis: Transport processes and regional pollutant budgets over topography of varying complexity (1996)
- Doctoral advisor: Albert Waldvogel

Academic work
- Discipline: Environmental science
- Sub-discipline: Atmospheric science
- Institutions: EPFL (École Polytechnique Fédérale de Lausanne); WSL (Swiss Federal Institute for Forest, Snow and Landscape Research)
- Main interests: Environmental and atmospheric science
- Website: https://www.epfl.ch/labs/cryos

Michael Lehning (born 1967) is a German and Swiss environmental and atmospheric scientist. He is a professor of environmental engineering at EPFL (École Polytechnique Fédérale de Lausanne), the head of EPFL's Laboratory of Cryospheric Sciences, and head of the group Snow Processes at the Swiss Federal Institute for Forest, Snow and Landscape Research (WSL).

== Career ==
Prof. Lehning received a Diploma in geo-ecology from the University of Bayreuth and a master's degree in atmospheric sciences at University of California, Davis both in 1993. He pursued post-graduate studies in statistics and a PhD in atmospheric physics and graduated in 1996 from ETH Zürich with a thesis on "Transport processes and regional pollutant budgets over topography of varying complexity" supervised by Albert Waldvogel.

In 1997, he became a scientific collaborator at the Institute for Snow and Avalanche Research (SLF) of the WSL located in Davos, Switzerland. In 2001 he became head of the research and development team on Process Models, and from 2006 to 2018 he was head of the research unit on Snow and Permafrost.

Since 2011, he is a full professor at the EPFL and the head of the Laboratory of Cryospheric Sciences at EPFL's School of Architecture, Civil and Environmental Engineering. Since 2018, he is also head of the group Snow Processes at SLF. From 2021 to 2024, he co-directed the UNIL-EPFL center for climate action CLIMACT.

== Research ==
Prof. Lehning's research is focused on snow processes and snow atmosphere interactions. This includes advancing the understanding of fluid dynamics of drifting and blowing snow, and generating advanced snow models, which can be used to assess and predict changes in surface mass balance of our snow and ice surfaces. In this context, he coined the term Preferential Deposition to describe the process that leads to uneven precipitation distribution in mountains. This allows for an improved assessment of avalanche danger, estimating the future of snow, hydropower and stream temperatures, and finding management practices in ski areas.

Using the knowledge on wind and radiation processes, Prof. Lehning has more recently contributed to investigating the potential of renewable energy installations in mountains to visualise how the Swiss energy turn around could be achieved.

He is the founder of spin-off companies such as APLsolut and SUNWELL.

== Distinctions ==
In 2020, Prof. Lehning won the new research programme Swiss Energy Research for the Energy Transition (SWEET) awarded Swiss Federal Office of Energy (SFOE) that aims at the de-centralised energy supply in the Swiss energy system. The grant totals a budget of CHF 21 million, involves 15 research and more than 40 implementation partners, and runs over 6 years. In 2001, Lehning received the Award for extraordinary performance in transfer of scientific knowledge to users from the Swiss Federal Institute for Forest, Snow and Landscape Research.

In 2025, Prof. Lehning was granted the co-direction of the project "Current and future shifts of snow regimes in extreme environments (SNOWSHIFTS)" funded by European Research Council (ERC), that will run from 2026 to 2032 : Snowshifts ERC PROJECT.

== Selected works ==
- Bender, Esther; Lehning, Michael; Fiddes, Joel (2020). "Changes in Climatology, Snow Cover, and Ground Temperatures at High Alpine Locations". Frontiers in Earth Science. 8: 100. Bibcode:2020FrEaS...8..100B. doi:10.3389/feart.2020.00100. ISSN 2296-6463. S2CID 218582066.<
- Comola, F.; Gaume, J.; Kok, J. F.; Lehning, M. (2019). "Cohesion-Induced Enhancement of Aeolian Saltation". Geophysical Research Letters. 46 (10): 5566–5574. Bibcode:2019GeoRL..46.5566C. doi:10.1029/2019gl082195. S2CID 155516888.
- Comola, F.; Giometto, M. G.; Salesky, S. T.; Parlange, M. B.; Lehning, M. (27 July 2019). "Preferential Deposition of Snow and Dust Over Hills: Governing Processes and Relevant Scales". Journal of Geophysical Research: Atmospheres. 124 (14): 7951–7974. Bibcode:2019JGRD..124.7951C. doi:10.1029/2018JD029614. ISSN 2169-897X. S2CID 198424482.
- Gerber, Franziska; Mott, Rebecca; Lehning, Michael (2019). "The Importance of Near-Surface Winter Precipitation Processes in Complex Alpine Terrain". Journal of Hydrometeorology. 20 (2): 177–196. Bibcode:2019JHyMe..20..177G. doi:10.1175/Jhm-D-18-0055.1. S2CID 133785937.
- Kahl, Annelen; Dujardin, Jérôme; Lehning, Michael (2019). "The bright side of PV production in snow-covered mountains". Proceedings of the National Academy of Sciences. 116 (4): 1162–1167. Bibcode:2019PNAS..116.1162K. doi:10.1073/pnas.1720808116. PMC 6347694. PMID 30617063.
- Lehning, M.; Löwe, H.; Ryser, M.; Raderschall, N. (July 2008). "Inhomogeneous precipitation distribution and snow transport in steep terrain: SNOW DRIFT AND INHOMOGENEOUS PRECIPITATION". Water Resources Research. 44 (7). doi:10.1029/2007WR006545. S2CID 128856304.
