= Konrad Steffen =

Swiss glaciologist (1952–2020)

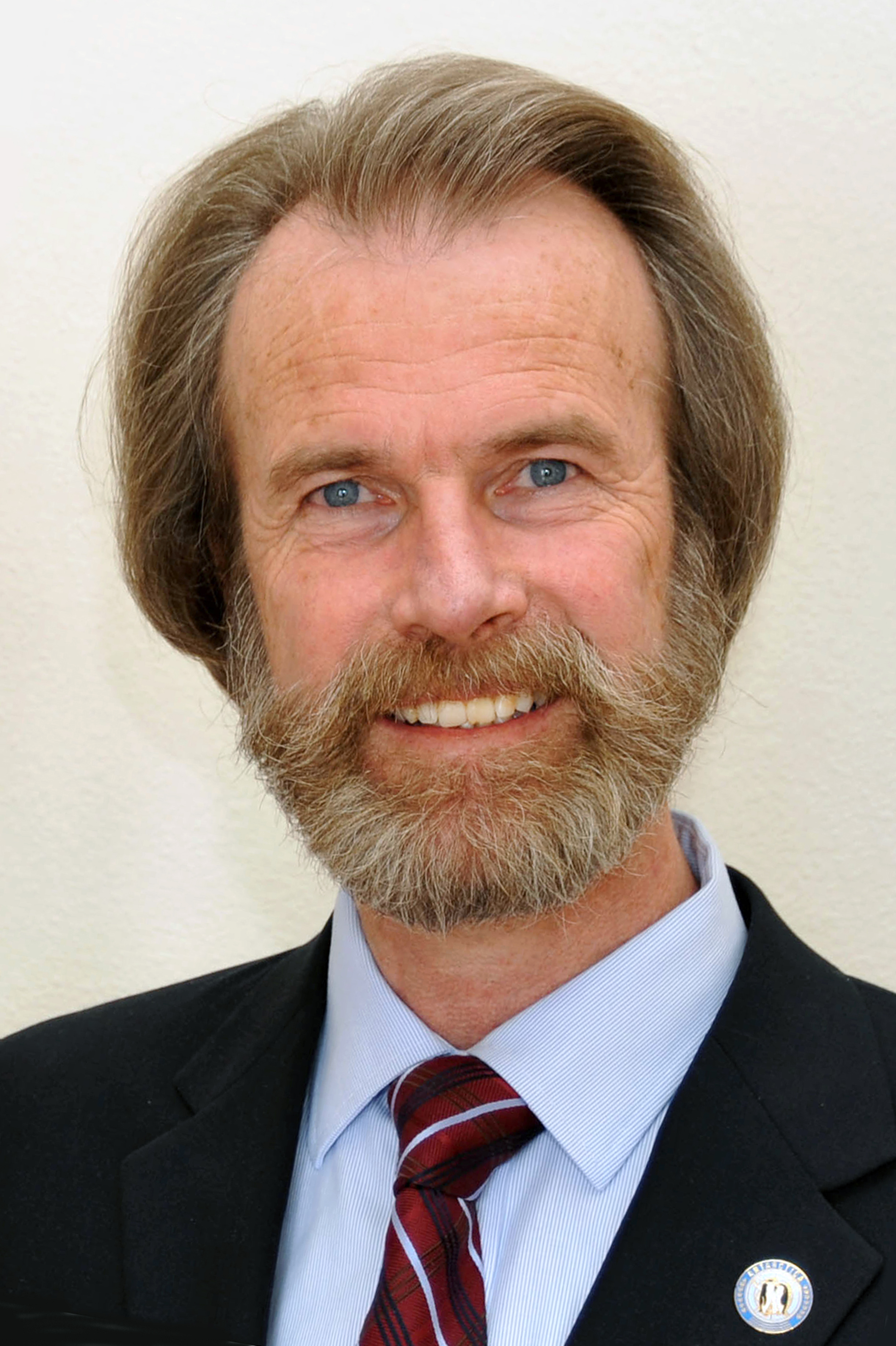
- Konrad Steffen in 2012
- Born: 2 January 1952; Zurich, Switzerland
- Died: 8 August 2020 (aged 68); Avannaata, Greenland
- Citizenship: Swiss-American
- Education: ETH Zurich
- Known for: Research into climate change in the Arctic and Arctic sea ice
- Spouses: Regula Werner (died 2011); Bianca Perren
- Children: 2
- Scientific career
- Fields: Glaciology
- Workplaces: University of Colorado Boulder, Swiss Federal Institute for Forest, Snow and Landscape Research
- Thesis: Surface temperature and sea ice of an arctic polynya: north water in winter : Canad. and greenlandic high arctic (1985)
- Doctoral advisor: Atsumu Ohmura
- Doctoral students: Waleed Abdalati Jason Box Julienne Stroeve
- Website: www.wsl.ch/en/employees/steffen

Konrad "Koni" Steffen (2 January 1952 – 8 August 2020) was a Swiss glaciologist, known for his research into the impact of global warming on the Arctic.

== Early life and education ==
Konrad Steffen was born on January 2, 1952, in Zurich, Switzerland to Ernst and Maria Steffen, née Kurzinski. His father was a fashion designer and his mother ran an accounting firm. As a child, Steffen aspired to become an actor, but his father insisted he pursue a profession first.

Steffen attended ETH Zurich, from which he received his undergraduate degree or Diplom in 1977 and a Doctor of Science degree (Ph.D.) in natural sciences in 1984. In 1986, Steffen went to the United States as a visiting fellow at the Cooperative Institute at the University of Colorado Boulder.

== Career ==
Steffen was an associate professor of geography at the University of Colorado Boulder from 1991 to 1997, whereupon he became a full professor there. He served as the director of the Cooperative Institute for Research in Environmental Sciences at Boulder from 2005 to 2012. He took office as the director of the Swiss Federal Institute for Forest, Snow and Landscape Research on July 1, 2012.

== Research ==
Steffen was known for his research into Arctic sea ice and the glaciers of Greenland, and how they are affected by global warming. He often traveled to Greenland to study these glaciers firsthand; for example, when studying Petermann Glacier for three weeks in 2004, Steffen did so from a camp set up 4,000 feet up the flanks of the glacier's ice cap. He also operated a network of 20 weather stations on the Greenland ice sheet, the first of which, Swiss Camp, he established in 1990.

He argued that due to this ice sheet melting faster than anticipated, sea levels could rise by about 3 feet by 2100, considerably higher than the IPCC's upper limit of 59 centimetres (1.94 ft), and that Greenland might lose all its ice in 10,000 years, but Antarctica would take considerably longer, since it is so much bigger.

He was a lead author of the "Observations: Cryosphere" chapter of the IPCC AR5, released in 2013.

Steffen's legacy included conducting extensive geoscience research, then translating the value and implications of the scientific data for nonspecialists, including many journalists who then could inform the public and policymakers. He also served on the United Nations Intergovernmental Panel on Climate Change (IPCC).

== Awards & Recognition ==
In October 2017, Steffen received the Lowell Thomas Award from the Explorers Club, a non-profit group that promotes scientific exploration. The award is presented by the president of the club on special occasions to groups of outstanding explorers. The club cited Steffen's research of sea level changes, sensitivity studies of large ice sheets using in situ and modeling results.

In January 2025, filmmaker Corina Gamma released a documentary about Konrad Steffen called "Iceman" (German title: Der Eismann). It was presented at the Solothurner Filmtage 2025.

== Personal life ==
Steffen had two children with first wife Regula Werner, who died in 2011 from cancer. He later married Bianca Perren, a paleoclimatologist working with the British Antarctic Survey.

== Death ==
Steffen died on 8 August 2020 in an accident while on a field trip in Greenland. He fell into a crevasse near the Swiss Camp research station. In recent years, the extent of crevassed ice had increased around Swiss Camp in response to changes in ice-sheet flow due to climate change.

== Glacier name ==
On 20 June 2022, the Place Names Committee of Greenland's Language Secretariat officially announced the new glacier name Sermeq Konrad Steffen, in recognition of Steffen's exceptional contributions to Greenland science and society. This marked the first time since 1983, when the responsibility for place naming was transferred from Denmark to Greenland, that a non-Greenlandic glacier name was introduced in Greenland. The glacier name proposal was under review by Greenland's Language Secretariat for 492 days.
