= Swiss Federal Institute for Forest, Snow and Landscape Research =

Swiss research institution

Coordinates: 47.3604°N 8.4549°E

The Swiss Federal Institute for Forest, Snow and Landscape Research WSL (WSL, German: Eidgenössische Forschungsanstalt für Wald, Schnee und Landschaft WSL, French: Institut fédéral de recherches sur la forêt, la neige et le paysage WSL, Italian: Istituto federale di ricerca per la foresta, la neve e il paesaggio WSL) is a research organisation specialising in on forests, landscapes, biodiversity, natural hazards, snow and ice.

As of the end of 2024, WSL employed approximately 650 people. In addition to its headquarters in Birmensdorf and the SLF in Davos, it has operated branch offices in Lausanne and Cadenazzo since 1991 and in Sion since 1996.

== Tasks ==
WSL forms part of the research institutes of the ETH Domain. Their remit is as follows:

- They conduct research in their area of responsibility and provide scientific and technical services
- They are available to universities for teaching and research to the best of their ability

WSL is active in sustainable spatial development, in particular development in mountain areas and urban centres, in the following specialist areas:

- Landscape research
- Forest ecology and forest management
- Natural hazards and integral risk management
- Snow, ice, avalanches and permafrost

In addition to its research mandate, WSL has four tasks assigned to it by the federal government:

- In collaboration with the Federal Office for the Environment (FOEN), WSL gathers the fundamental data for the Swiss National Forest Inventory (NFI) and the Long-term Forest Ecosystem Research programme. This data provides insights into the pressures on forest ecosystems.
- The WSL Institute for Snow and Avalanche Research SLF is responsible for the avalanche warning service in Switzerland
- WSL runs the Swiss Competence center of Forest Protection and
- ensures the scientific and technical support of forestry plant protection

To fulfil its remit, WSL has defined five core topics that describe its long-term field of activity, as well as four development priorities for the years up to 2035.

=== Core Topics and Development Priorities ===
WSL concentrates on five central research areas: Forest, Biodiversity, Landscape, Natural Hazards and Snow and Ice. In the area of forests, WSL investigates the influence of climate change, pollutants and disturbances such as forest fires on forest ecosystems. In biodiversity, it focusses on species diversity, ecological interactions and invasive species in order to monitor and promote biodiversity. Landscape research develops the basis for sustainable land use and landscape planning. In the area of natural hazards, WSL researches avalanches, floods and forest fires in order to protect the population. Studies on snow and ice analyse the effects of climate change on water resources and winter tourism.

The WSL Strategy 2035 is founded on four overarching development priorities that build on the existing core themes. The consequences of global change, sustainable urbanisation, environmental governance and multifunctional landscapes and ecosystems will be the focus of our research. We will develop strategies for mitigating and adapting to global change and research urban spaces for environmentally compatible and socially inclusive cities. WSL promotes research on environmental governance in order to improve decision-making processes and policy implementation. We will identify synergies in landscapes and ecosystems to minimise trade-offs between different functions and uses.

== History ==
The WSL was established in 1885 as the Swiss Central Institute for Forestry Experimentation at the recommendation of Federal Forest Inspector Johann Wilhelm Coaz and ETH Professor Elias Landolt. It was renamed the Swiss Federal Institute for Forestry Experimentation (EAFV) in 1933. The Institute's objective is to provide a comprehensive and reliable scientific basis for forestry, through experimental, investigative and observational activities, and to contribute to the solution of significant forest meteorological issues.

Initially, the focus was on the restoration and protection of the heavily overexploited Swiss forest. On 1 January 1888, three unused rooms in the attic of the Agricultural and Forestry Building [of the Polytechnic] were provisionally converted into workrooms. In 1889, the Central Institute moved into the Physics building. It mainly carried out growth analyses. Philipp Flury, the technical assistant at the time, began to set up a network of crop trials. By the turn of the century, this included 460 plots. In 1888, the Institute leased an area of 1 hectare in Adlisberg from the Zurich City Forestry Department to establish an experimental garden, which remained in use until 1952.

In 1892, the Central Institute, together with partners from Germany and Austria, founded the International Union of Forest Research Organisations (IUFRO), which is now the most important global network of forest scientists.

Under the direction of Arnold Engler, hydrological gauging stations were set up in 1903, demonstrating the positive impact of forests on floods, but also their limited effectiveness.

In 1917, three years after the founding of the Swiss National Park, the Grisons botanist Josias Braun-Blanquet established the first permanent plots to observe vegetation development. Over time, WSL botanists expanded and analysed this network.

In the 1930s, the Avalanche Research Commission was established with the objective of promoting the construction of a snow laboratory on the Weissfluhjoch (2693 meters, 8835 ft) and the investigation of snow structure. In 1942, the Swiss Federal Institute for Snow and Avalanche Research (SLF) was founded and assumed responsibility for avalanche warning. As winter sports and electrification grew in importance, avalanches and snow became central research topics. Since 1997/98, the SLF has been responsible for producing a national Avalanche Bulletin twice a day during the winter.

After the Second World War, WSL expanded its research to include topics such as air pollution, landscape research and biodiversity. The intense debate on forest dieback in the 1980s led to important environmental policy measures and increased research. In 1989, the SLF became part of the WSL, creating today's Swiss Federal Institute for Forest, Snow and Landscape Research. WSL is part of the ETH Domain, which comprises the two Federal Institutes of Technology in Zurich (ETH Zurich) and Lausanne (EPFL), the four research institutes, the Paul Scherrer Institute (PSI), the Swiss Federal Laboratories for Materials Testing and Research (Empa) and the Swiss Federal Institute of Aquatic Science and Technology (Eawag). With its numerous locations, the ETH Domain is firmly anchored in the regions.

WSL continued to expand its regional presence in order to promote local synergies and intensify dialogue with practitioners. New locations were opened in Lausanne, Bellinzona and Sion. Close links between research and practice and cooperation with international partners are still key elements today.

In 1996, the newly constructed institute building on the Flüelastrasse in Davos Dorf became the headquarters of the SLF. The former institute building on the Weissfluhjoch is still available for research purposes. The SLF began to build up the Intercantonal Measuring and Information System IMIS, a network of snow and wind measuring stations.

In 2002, researchers at the SLF launched the Intercantonal Early Warning and Crisis Information System IFKIS for avalanche warning services.

In 2010, the joint information platform Natural Hazards GIN, developed by WSL in collaboration with MeteoSwiss and the FOEN, went live. In the same year, WSL and SLF celebrated their 125th and 75th anniversaries, respectively, with around 40 events.

In 2024, WSL adopted a new Strategy 2035 to "make a substantial contribution to overcoming global challenges".

=== WSL Directorate since 1887 ===
1887-1896	Anton Bühler
1897-1901	Conrad Bourgeois
1902-1923	Arnold Engler
1924-1925	Philipp Flury (ai)
1925-1933	Henri Badoux
1934-1954	Hans Burger (first full-time director)
1955-1968	Albert Kurt
1969-1986	Walter Bosshard
1986-1996	Rodolphe Schläpfer
1996-1997	Walter Ammann (ai)
1998-2004	Mario Broggi
2004-2004	Jakob Roost
2007-2012	James Kirchner
2012-2020	Konrad Steffen
2020-2021	Christoph Hegg (ai)
2021-2023	Beate Jessel
2023-2024	Christoph Hegg (ai)
Since 2024	Rolf Holderegger

== See also ==
- Science and technology in Switzerland
- Federal Office of Meteorology and Climatology
