= Lonnie Thompson =

American paleoclimatologist (1948–2026)

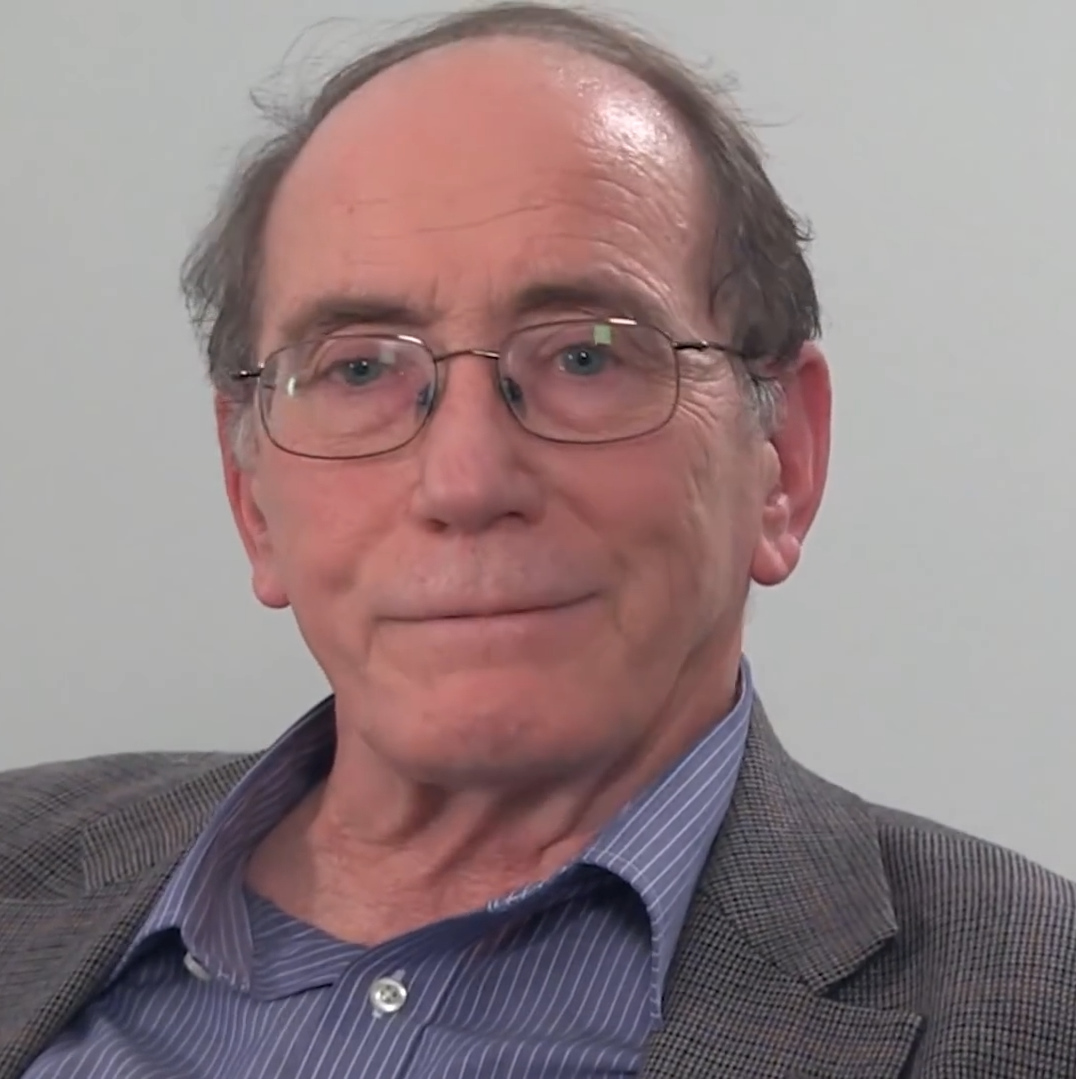
- Thompson in 2015
- Born: July 1, 1948; Gassaway, West Virginia, U.S.
- Died: November 2, 2026 (aged 78); Columbus, Ohio, U.S.
- Education: Ohio State University (M.S. & Ph.D.); Marshall University (B.S.)
- Scientific career
- Fields: Geology; Paleoclimatology; Glaciology
- Thesis: Microparticles, ice sheets and climate (1976)

Lonnie Gene Thompson (July 1, 1948 – November 2, 2026) was an American paleoclimatologist and academic who was a professor in the School of Earth Sciences at Ohio State University. He achieved global recognition for his drilling and analysis of ice cores from ice caps and mountain glaciers in the tropical and sub-tropical regions of the world. With his wife, Ellen Mosley-Thompson, he ran the ice core paleoclimatology research group at the Byrd Polar Research Center.

== Early life and education ==
Thompson was born July 1, 1948, in Gassaway, West Virginia, and was raised there on a farm. He obtained an undergraduate degree from Marshall University, majoring in geology. He subsequently attended Ohio State University where he received M.S. and Ph.D. degrees in geology.

== Career and impact ==
Thompson was one of the world's foremost authorities on paleoclimatology and glaciology. For over 40 years, he led 60 expeditions to conduct ice-core drilling programs in Polar Regions, and to tropical and subtropical ice fields in 16 countries including China, Peru, Russia, Tanzania and Papua, Indonesia (New Guinea). He and his team from the Ohio State University developed light-weight solar-powered drilling equipment for the acquisition of ice cores from ice fields in the tropical South American Andes, the Himalayas, and on Mount Kilimanjaro in Tanzania. The results from these paleoclimate histories were published in more than 230 articles and contributed toward improved understanding of Earth’s climate system, both past and present.

In the 1970s, he was the first scientist "to retrieve ice samples from a remote tropical ice cap, such as the Quelccaya Ice Cap in the Andes of Peru, and analyze them for ancient climate signals." He created the ice core research program at Ohio State while still a graduate student there. In regards to the dedication required to attain this ice, Mark Bowen writes:

In his efforts to obtain ice cores, Thompson has spent an enormous amount of time at elevations above 5,500 meters. High-altitude climbers typically tackle a peak by spending time in a series of camps at lower elevations to acclimatize and then making a final rushed push for the summit. But Thompson and his loyal band of colleagues, students and mountain guides spend literally months at a time working at altitude... Thompson and his colleagues have managed to drill into tropical glaciers with nothing more to rely on than a combination of modest funding, low-tech equipment, ingenuity and sheer muscle power. Because the thin air at high altitudes precludes the use of helicopters, all of the drilling equipment and supplies must be carried up and down the slopes by yaks, mules, horses or humans...

For comparison, the Everest lower base camp is at 5,380 m (17,700 ft) and the upper base camp is at 6,500 m (21,300 ft). (The mountain itself is 8,848 m (29,029 ft).) Rolling Stone magazine says that there is no person in the world who has spent more time above 18,000 feet than Lonnie Thompson.

Thompson stated on his curriculum vitae that his observations of glacier retreat (1970s–2000s) "confirm that glaciers around the world are melting and provide clear evidence that the warming of the last 50 years is now outside the range of climate variability for several millennia, if not longer". In 2001, he predicted that the famed snows of Africa's Mount Kilimanjaro would melt within the next 20 years, a victim of climate change across the tropics. Return expeditions to the mountain have shown that changes in the mountain's ice fields may signal an even quicker melting of its snow fields, which Thompson documented had existed for thousands of years. Thompson and his wife both served as advisers for the Academy Award-winning 2006 documentary An Inconvenient Truth, by Al Gore, Jr., and some of their work was referenced in the movie.

== Personal life and death ==
Lonnie Thompson was married to Ellen Mosley-Thompson for more than 40 years. They met in the 1970s in the Marshall University while he was studying geology and she was pursuing a degree in physics. After their graduation, they both pursued graduate degrees in geology at the Ohio State University. They worked together as research partners to document and understand the effects of climate change on the world's glacial regions and to develop the technology to drill deep in the ice.

On May 1, 2012, he underwent a successful heart transplant. Thompson died at his home in Columbus, Ohio, on November 2, 2026, following a short illness. He was 78.

== Biographies ==
Thompson's research expeditions were the subject of a book by Mark Bowen titled Thin Ice: Unlocking the Secrets of Climate in the World's Highest Mountains (2005).

Thompson was featured in the 2023 documentary film Canary, which was directed by Danny O'Malley and Alex Rivest. Canary won "Best Feature" at the 2024 Jackson Wild Media Awards.

== Honors and awards ==
- 2001: Thompson was featured among eighteen scientists and researchers as "America's Best" by CNN and Time Magazine.
- 2002: Thompson was awarded the Dr A.H. Heineken Prize for Environmental Sciences by the Royal Netherlands Academy of Arts and Sciences.
- 2002: Thompson was awarded the Vega Medal by the Swedish Society for Anthropology and Geography.
- 2005: Thompson was elected to the National Academy of Sciences.
- November, 2005: Thompson was featured in a "Rolling Stone" article, "The Ice Hunter".
- 2005: Thompson was awarded the prestigious Tyler Prize for Environmental Achievement, an honor often regarded as the environmental science equivalent to the Nobel Prize.
- 2006: Thompson was elected to the American Philosophical Society.
- February, 2007: Mosley-Thompson and Thompson were jointly awarded the Roy Chapman Andrews Society Distinguished Explorer Award at Beloit College, Beloit, WI.
- May, 2007: Thompson is named to receive the National Medal of Science. This honor is the highest the United States can bestow upon an American scientist. It was presented to Thompson by President Bush in July 2007 (Award year 2005).
- 2007: Thompson was awarded Seligman Crystal by the International Glaciological Society. The Crystal is considered to be one of the highest awards in glaciology.
- 2008: Mosley-Thompson and Thompson share the $1 million Dan David Prize (Future category) with British researcher Geoffrey Eglinton.
- 2008: Thompson was listed as one of Time Magazine's Heroes of the Environment.
- 2012: Mosley-Thompson and Thompson were jointly awarded the Benjamin Franklin Medal in Earth and Environmental Science from the Franklin Institute.
- 2013: International Science and Technology Cooperation Award, China
- 2021: BBVA Foundation Frontiers of Knowledge Award in the category "Climate Change".

== Publications ==
Lonnie Thompson has been awarded 53 research grants from the NSF, NASA, NOAA and NGS and has published 165 papers. An abbreviated list of expeditions, grants, and publications can be found in his Ohio State curriculum vitae (PDF).

Some notable publications include:

- Thompson, L. G.; Mosley-Thompson, E.; Brecher, H.; Davis, M.; León, B.; Les, D.; Lin, P. -N.; Mashiotta, T.; Mountain, K. (2006). "Inaugural Article: Abrupt tropical climate change: Past and present". Proceedings of the National Academy of Sciences. 103 (28): 10536–43. Bibcode:2006PNAS..10310536T. doi:10.1073/pnas.0603900103. PMC 1484420. PMID 16815970.
- Thompson, L.G.; Mosley-Thompson, E.; Davis, M.E.; Lin, P.-N.; Henderson, K.; Mashiotta, T.A. (2003). "Tropical glacier and ice core evidence of climate change on annual to millennial time scales" (PDF). Climatic Change. 59 (1–2): 137–155. Bibcode:2003ClCh...59..137T. doi:10.1023/A:1024472313775. S2CID 18990647. Archived from the original (PDF) on December 4, 2010.
- Thompson, L. G.; Mosley-Thompson, E.; Davis, M. E.; Henderson, K. A.; Brecher, H. H.; Zagorodnov, V. S.; Mashiotta, T. A.; Lin, P. N.; Mikhalenko, V. N.; Hardy, D. R.; Beer, J. (2002). "Kilimanjaro Ice Core Records: Evidence of Holocene Climate Change in Tropical Africa" (PDF). Science. 298 (5593): 589–593. Bibcode:2002Sci...298..589T. doi:10.1126/science.1073198. PMID 12386332. S2CID 32880316. Archived from the original (PDF) on December 17, 2008.
- Thompson, L. G. (2000). "Ice core evidence for climate change in the Tropics: Implications for our future". Quaternary Science Reviews. 19 (1–5): 19–35. Bibcode:2000QSRv...19...19T. doi:10.1016/S0277-3791(99)00052-9.
- Thompson, L. G.; Yao, T.; Davis, M. E.; Henderson, K. A.; Mosley-Thompson, E.; Lin, P. N.; Beer, J.; Synal, H. A.; Cole-Dai, J. (1997). "Tropical Climate Instability: The Last Glacial Cycle from a Qinghai-Tibetan Ice Core". Science. 276 (5320): 1821. doi:10.1126/science.276.5320.1821.
