= Julienne Stroeve =

American climatologist

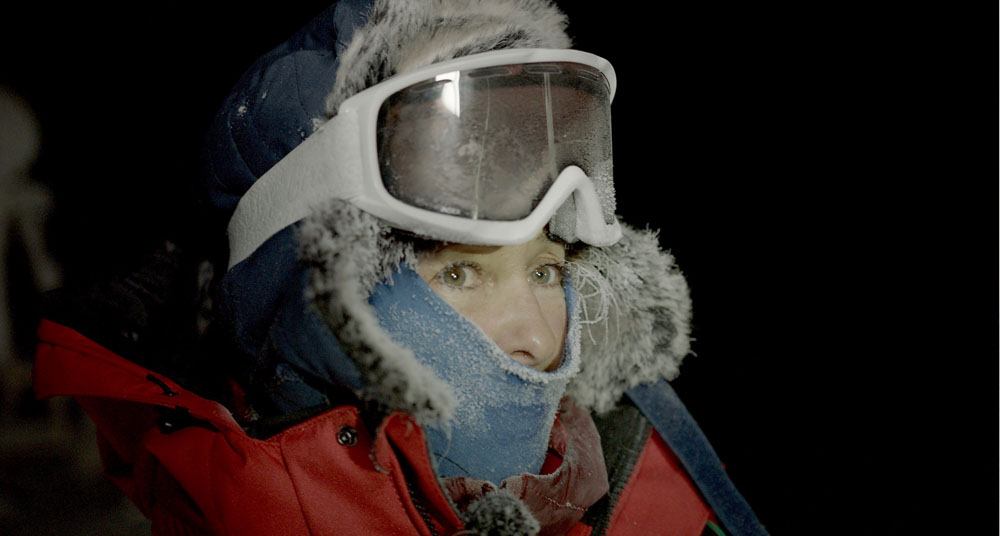
- Education: University of Colorado Boulder (Ph.D., 1996)
- Known for: Arctic sea-ice decline; satellite remote sensing of snow and sea ice
- Awards: Julia and Johannes Weertman Medal (2020); Royal Society Wolfson Merit Award (2015)
- Scientific career
- Fields: Polar climatology, Remote sensing, Sea ice
- Workplaces: University of Bremen, Alfred Wegener Institute for Polar and Marine Research, University College London, University of Manitoba, National Snow and Ice Data Center
- Thesis: Radiation climatology of the Greenland ice sheet (1996)
- Doctoral advisor: Konrad Steffen

Julienne Christine Stroeve is a polar climate scientist known for her research on remote sensing of ice and snow. Since the 2024/25 winter semester, she has been Professor of Polar Observation and Modeling in the Faculty of Physics / Electrical Engineering at the University of Bremen, as part of a cooperation professorship with the Alfred Wegener Institute, Helmholtz Centre for Polar and Marine Research (AWI). She is also a professor of Polar Observation and Modelling at University College London, affiliated with the Centre for Polar Observation and Modelling, and a senior research scientist at the National Snow and Ice Data Center. She has contributed to the development of SnowModel‑LG, a pan‑Arctic Lagrangian snow‑on‑sea‑ice model used to simulate snow depth and density evolution over sea ice. She is known for demonstrating that Arctic sea ice has declined more rapidly than projected by climate models, for identifying changes in the Arctic melt season, and for research on Greenland ice‑sheet albedo trends. Her work integrates satellite remote sensing, field observations, and physically based modeling, including contributions to the MOSAiC Expedition. Stroeve has received major scientific awards, including the Royal Society Wolfson Merit Award and the European Geosciences Union Julia and Johannes Weertman Medal, and is listed as an ISI Highly Cited Researcher.

== Career ==
Stroeve received a PhD in geography from the University of Colorado Boulder in 1996, with a dissertation on the radiation climatology of the Greenland ice sheet. She later became a senior research scientist at the National Snow and Ice Data Center within the Cooperative Institute for Research in Environmental Sciences. In 2016 she moved to University College London, where she led the Centre for Polar Observation and Modelling. She later held the Canada 150 Research Chair in Climate Sea Ice Coupling at the University of Manitoba. In 2023 she was awarded a Helmholtz Fellowship at the University of Bremen and the Alfred Wegener Institute.

== Research ==
Stroeve's research focuses on remote sensing of snow and sea ice, including satellite retrievals of sea-ice concentration, ice thickness, snow depth, surface albedo, and surface temperature. Her work also addresses atmosphere–sea-ice interactions, sea-ice predictability, attribution of sea-ice variability, and the implications of sea-ice loss for climate, marine ecosystems, and northern communities.

A 2007 study by Stroeve and colleagues found that Arctic sea ice decline was occurring faster than projected by many climate models. She has also studied changes in the Arctic melt season, showing that the melt season lengthened from 1979 to 2013, mainly because of later autumn freeze-up, with implications for solar energy absorption and further sea-ice loss. Stroeve has also used satellite observations to estimate potential timing of sea ice-associated algal bloom onset, linking changes in snow and sea-ice cover to under-ice light availability and Arctic marine ecosystem impacts. Stroeve is a co‑author of the SnowModel‑LG system, a physically based Lagrangian model used to simulate pan‑Arctic snow depth, density, and other snowpack properties over sea ice. The model produces daily snow‑on‑sea‑ice fields from 1980 onward and incorporates multilayer snow physics, blowing‑snow sublimation, grain‑size evolution, and superimposed ice formation. Stroeve was also a co-author of a study on the darkening of the Greenland ice sheet, which examined reductions in albedo associated with snow grain growth, light-absorbing impurities, biological activity, exposure of bare ice, melt pools, and related feedbacks.

Julienne Stroeve was aboard the RV Polarstern in mid-winter 2019–2020 during the MOSAiC Expedition, where she conducted experiments to assess the accuracy of satellite radar systems used to map sea-ice thickness. During MOSAiC, Stroeve and colleagues used surface-based Ku- and Ka-band radar measurements to study how snow properties affect radar retrievals of sea-ice thickness and snow depth.

== Selected publications ==
- Stroeve, J. C., Veyssiere, G., Nab, C., et al. (2024). Mapping potential timing of ice algal blooms from satellite. Geophysical Research Letters, 51(8), e2023GL106486. doi:10.1029/2023GL106486.
- Liston, G. E., Itkin, P., Stroeve, J., et al. (2020). A Lagrangian snow‑evolution system for sea‑ice applications (SnowModel‑LG): Part I—Model description. Journal of Geophysical Research: Oceans, 125, e2019JC015913. doi:10.1029/2019JC015913.
- Stroeve, J., Nandan, V., Willatt, R., et al. (2020). Surface‑based Ku‑ and Ka‑band polarimetric radar for sea ice studies. The Cryosphere, 14(12), 4405–4426. doi:10.5194/tc-14-4405-2020.
- Tedesco, M., Doherty, S., Fettweis, X., Alexander, P., Jeyaratnam, J., & Stroeve, J. (2016). The darkening of the Greenland ice sheet: Trends, drivers, and projections (1981–2100). The Cryosphere, 10(2), 477–496. doi:10.5194/tc-10-477-2016.
- Stroeve, J. C., Markus, T., Boisvert, L., Miller, J., & Barrett, A. (2014). Changes in Arctic melt season and implications for sea ice loss. Geophysical Research Letters, 41(4), 1216–1225. doi:10.1002/2013GL058951.
- Stroeve, J., Holland, M. M., Meier, W., Scambos, T., & Serreze, M. (2007). Arctic sea ice decline: Faster than forecast. Geophysical Research Letters, 34(9), L09501. doi:10.1029/2007GL029703.

== Awards ==
Stroeve was awarded the EGU 2020 Julia and Johannes Weertman Medal for her "fundamental contributions to improved satellite observations of sea ice, better understanding of causes of sea-ice variability and change, and her compelling communication to the wider public". She received a Royal Society Wolfson Merit Award in 2015. She has been listed as an ISI highly cited researcher.
