= Byrd Polar and Climate Research Center =

Climate research center in the United States

Coordinates: 40.003300°N 83.038688°W

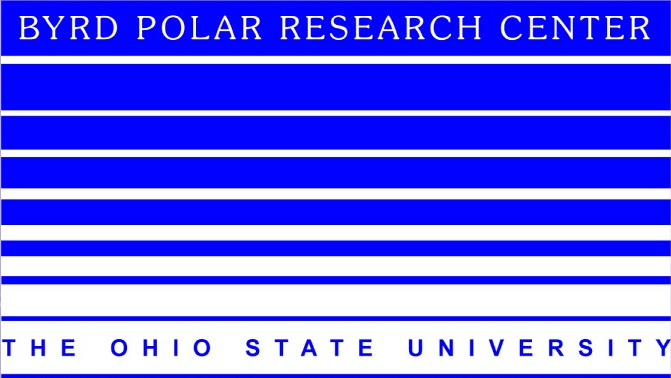
- Abbreviation: BPCRC
- Named after: Richard E. Byrd
- Established: 1960
- Founded at: Ohio State University
- Fields: polar, alpine, and climate research center
- Publication: Polar Archives
- Website: byrd.osu.edu
- Formerly called: Institute for Polar Studies

The Byrd Polar and Climate Research Center (BPCRC), formerly Institute for Polar Studies, is a polar, alpine, and climate research center at Ohio State University founded in 1960.

== History and research ==
The Byrd Polar and Climate Research Center (BPCRC) at Ohio State University was established in 1960 as the Institute for Polar Studies. BPCRC is the oldest research center at Ohio State University. The name was changed to the Byrd Polar Research Center in 1987 after the polar explorer and aviator Richard E. Byrd when Ohio State purchased the Byrd papers from the Byrd family in 1985. In 2014, the center officially added "Climate" to its name.

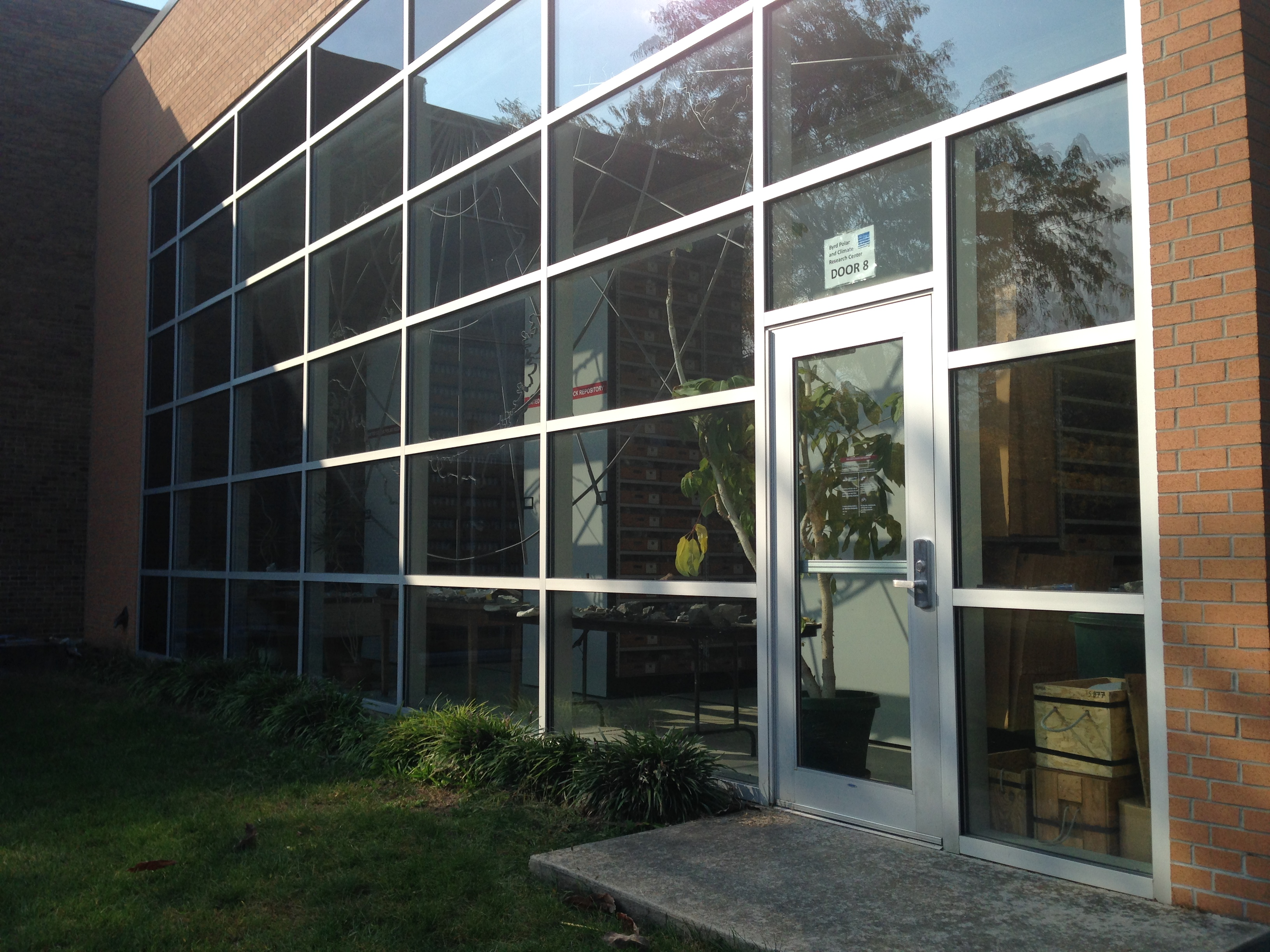
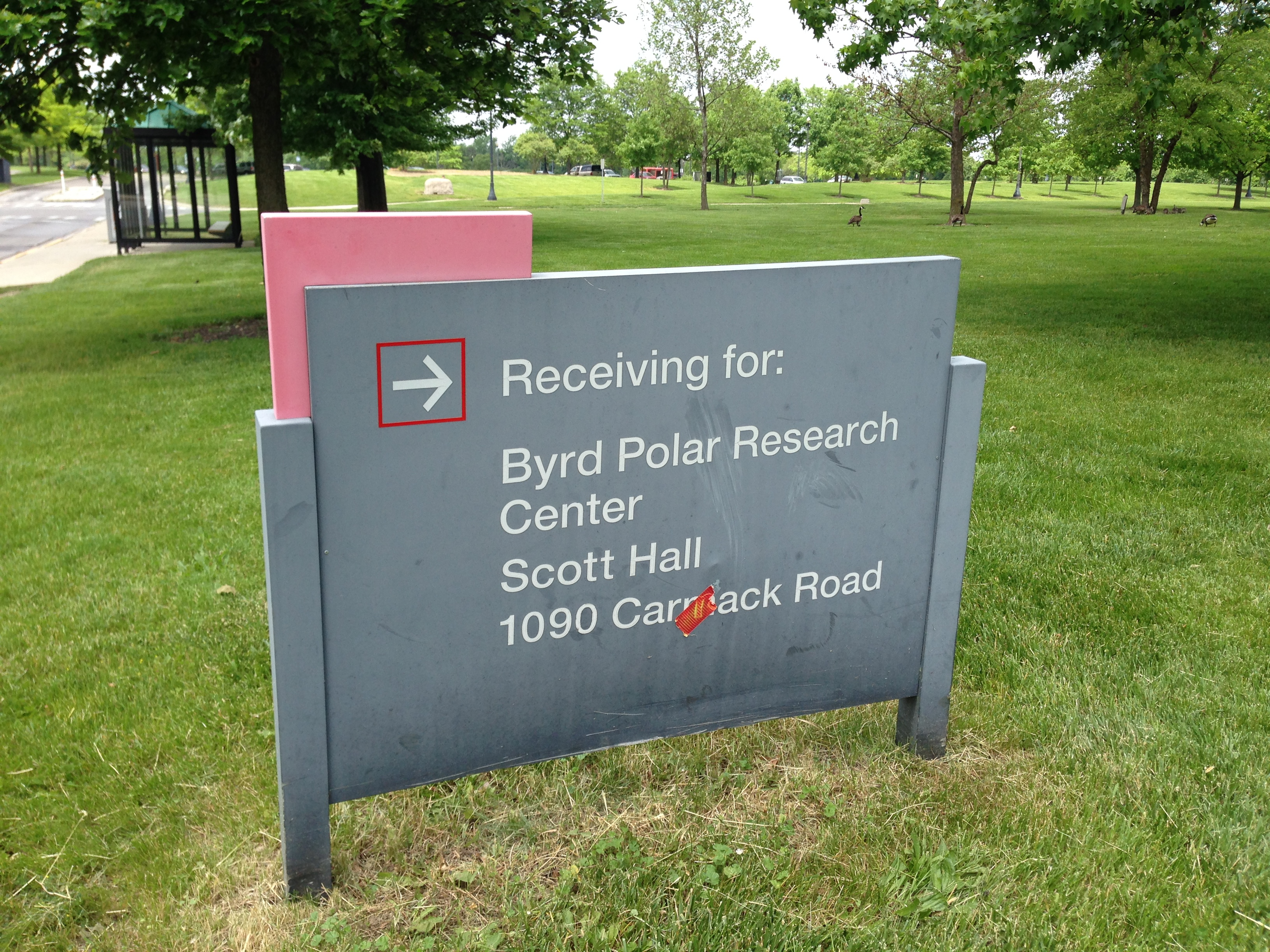

BPCRC conducts interdisciplinary research at the nexus of Earth Sciences and Engineering. BPCRC is known for its ice core paleoclimatology research collecting ice core records from Earth's highest and most remote ice fields and modeling polar climate variability. Studies at BPCRC include paleoclimatology, remote sensing, polar meteorology, glacier dynamics, satellite hydrology, paleoceanography, environmental geochemistry, and climate change. BPCRC houses the Polar Rock Repository and the Goldthwait Polar Library.

== Research groups ==
=== Environmental Geochemistry ===
The Environmental Geochemistry group collects and analyzes soil and water samples from many locations around the world to study biogeochemical cycles, anthropogenic influences on natural systems, and to use geochemistry as a tool to learn more about various hydrological, biological and physical processes.

This group has conducted studies of the Dry Valleys region of Antarctica since 1993 as part of the NSF’s Long-Term Ecological Research (LTER) program. Ongoing projects in Antarctica include drilling into the subglacial ecosystem of "Blood Falls" in the Dry Valleys and measuring glacial melt input into the Southern Ocean in West Antarctica. Additionally, the group has studied of the deposition of mercury on the landscape in the U.S. and in Antarctica, and led investigations of chemical and physical weathering of rocks of high-standing oceanic islands like Taiwan and New Zealand. Members of this group also study the impact of human activities in urban areas on streams and lakes around Ohio.

=== Paleoceanography ===
The Paleoceanography group uses information gathered from sea floor sediments to discover how changes in circulation, temperature, sea ice and glacier mass have affected the global climate system throughout Earth’s history. These data from the past are used to assess present and future climate changes. The main focus of this group's research is on the Arctic Ocean and its history during the past several million years.

Sea floor sediments contain mineral and biological particles that are used for investigating past climate changes. A common type of biological particles is foraminifers, single-celled, amoeba-like protists that have a shell and either live on the sea bottom or float in the upper water column. There are an estimated 4,000 species living today. Foraminifers are sensitive to changes in their environment such as temperature and salinity, which makes them useful indicators (proxies) of past climate changes.

=== Satellite Hydrology ===
This group uses satellite-based measurements to study rivers, lakes, wetlands, and floodplains. Led by Profs. Douglas Alsdorf and Michael Durand, group members primarily use passive and active microwave measurements such as radar to measure surface water and snowpack. This group is working to better quantify the amount of water stored in snowpacks in the United States using satellite measurements.

This group is helping define an upcoming satellite, Surface Water and Ocean Topography. Rivers are fundamentally two-dimensional in their structure and function. This is evident in the Amazon River, where the floodplain width is measured in kilometres. Sensitive to climatic changes, arctic lakes pose another hydrologic measurement challenge. SWOT measurements will enable new under- standing of these complex systems. SWOT will track freshwater resources, and measure ocean currents. SWOT is a joint effort between NASA, the Jet Propulsion Laboratory, and the French space agency, CNES.

=== Glacier Environmental Change ===
The Glacier Environmental Change group researches patterns, processes, and impacts of environmental change, mostly in glaciated regions. We integrate methods of glacial geology, climatology, hydrology, and biogeochemistry. Specializing in tropical mountain regions, we study sites along the entire American Cordillera, in Africa, and in Central Ohio.

Glaciers impact environments and societies on different scales, from valleys to mountain ranges, spanning far into Earth’s past. Understanding glacier environmental changes requires many techniques and perspectives. Precise measurements from sensors on satellites and airplanes quantify ongoing glacier volume changes; landforms and lake sediments reveal past glacier-climate changes; the hydrochemistry of surface waters reflects glacier melt contribution; and computer simulations help explain past and future dynamics.

=== Polar Meteorology ===
The Polar Meteorology group has developed a model (Polar MM5) that is used to forecast weather conditions in the polar regions. The model has been used to stimulate conditions on the North American continent during the last ice age. In addition to weather prediction, the Polar MM5 model has been used for several simulations that examine the current and past climates over ice sheets, including one that illustrates conditions on the North American continent during the last ice age.

The Polar Meteorology Group also used the MM5 model to create what is called the Antarctic Mesoscale Prediction System (or AMPS). AMPS is a forecasting system used to make weather forecasts for Antarctica and the surrounding Southern Ocean in support of the United States Antarctic Program.

=== Polar Rock Repository ===
BPCRC maintains a large collection of geological samples and materials at the Polar Rock Repository. The PRR is a national facility that houses rock sample collections from Antarctica obtained by U.S. scientists over the past 40+ years.

Anne Grunow is the curator of the Polar Rock Repository. It is the only facility of its kind in the United States. The facility has storage capacity of ~140,000 rock samples and more than 30,000 samples have been catalogued already. The sample collections are available for researchers, educators, and museums to use. An online database and educational materials are available to help educate the public about polar geology.

=== Greenland field studies ===
1980s photogrammetrist Henry Brecher conducted aerial photographic surveys of major Greenland glaciers.

1990s Dr. Ellen Mosley-Thompson obtained ice cores from multiple locations, including GITS. Dr. Ken Jezek conducted radar studies in Greenland's accumulation and ablation zone. In 1995, Ken Jezek was at Swiss Camp.

2005 Jason Box assisted Konrad Steffen in automatic weather station maintenance at Swiss Camp and sites that comprise the Greenland Climate Network. Jason Box returned to Greenland to: 1.) obtain an ice core from a position in southeast Greenland where the Polar MM5 model simulates a maximum in snow accumulation, 2.) install time lapse cameras pointed at two outlet glaciers, and 3.) conduct supra-glacial melt lake measurements.

2007 In June, 2007, Jason Box established time lapse cameras beside 5 major west Greenland outlet glaciers. In July–September, Jason Box prepared for and occupied a camp near the Arctic Circle for 7 weeks during which time he conducted surface energy budget (melt) and supra-glacial melt lake measurements.

2008 During a 3-week field campaign, Jason Box, Ian Howat, Slawek Tulaczyk, and Yushin Ahn conducted measurements on Store Glacier, west Greenland. Ian Howat installed GPS sensors on Store Glacier in west Greenland.

2009 Jason Box installed time lapse cameras at Petermann Glacier in anticipation of a large area loss that eventually did occur August, 2010.

2010 April–May, 2010, Jason Box co-led a 750 km Arctic Circle Traverse across the southern Greenland ice sheet to obtain 3 ice cores and snow radar data to study spatial and temporal patterns of snowfall rates.

=== Antarctica ===
BPCRC scientists have obtained ice cores from multiple locations on the Antarctic Ice Sheet.

The Transantarctic Mountains bisect the continental ice sheets, with different ice flow dynamics on either side. Radarsat (radar images collected by orbiting satellites) is being used to map the ice sheets. Ice sheet flow into the ocean is increasing and in western Antarctica, the ice stream is draining into the Ross Ice Shelf with marked acceleration.

In March 2000, the largest observed iceberg in history broke away from the Ross Ice Shelf.

=== Peru ===
The Qori Kalis Glacier in Peru, the main outlet of the Quelccaya Ice Cap, is in retreat. The terminus of the glacier has shown reduction since 1963, with dramatic increases since 1980.

=== Africa ===
Lonnie Thompson has led research expeditions to the glaciers atop Mount Kilimanjaro. At the present rate of Kilimanjaro glacier decline, it is predicted that the snow cover will be completely gone by 2020, and the glacier may no longer exist by 2023.

== Polar Archives ==
The Polar Archives contain photographs taken by Australian photographer, soldier, and polar explorer Hubert Wilkins, during World War I, as well as many of his papers c. 1908-1987.
