= Jason Box =

Climate scientist

Jason Eric Box
- Education: University of Colorado Boulder
- Known for: Studying Greenland on field expeditions since 1994 and leading Dark Snow Project
- Spouse: Klara Mezgolitz-Box
- Children: 1
- Scientific career
- Fields: climatology, glaciology
- Workplaces: Geological Survey of Denmark and Greenland, Byrd Polar Research Center
- Thesis: Surface water vapor exchanges on the Greenland ice sheet derived from automated weather station data (2001)
- Doctoral advisor: Konrad Steffen

Jason Eric Box is an American glaciologist who is professor in glaciology at the Geological Survey of Denmark and Greenland. For 10 years (2002-2012) he worked at Byrd Polar Research Center at Ohio State University, eventually a tenured physical climatology and geography associate professor in the department of geography.

Box is a publisher in Arctic climatology: for five consecutive years (2008-2012) he was the lead author of the Greenland section of NOAA's annual State of the Climate report, was a contributing author to the IPCC AR4, IPCC AR5, IPCC AR6, and has authored more than 60 peer-reviewed publications focused on ice climate interactions. He is one of the members of the team doing field work for the Extreme Ice Survey and has led the Dark Snow Project, the first Internet crowd-funded Arctic scientific expedition. He is the former chair of the cryosphere focus group of the American Geophysical Union, of which he is a member. Scientists he has worked with include Eric Rignot. He has made more than 20 expeditions to Greenland since 1994, spending a total of more than one year on the Greenland ice.

== Early life and education ==
Box was raised in suburban Denver, the son of a satellite-system engineer who worked for an aerospace company. He has two older sisters. After his parents divorced, Box's father moved to England, giving his son the opportunity to attend high school in Innsbruck. While attending the University of Colorado, Boulder, Box joined a band called "The Sensors," where he played guitar and sang vocals. His sister was also in the band. Box received his BA, MA, and PhD from the University of Colorado, Boulder in 1994, 1997, and 2001, respectively. He began his expeditions to Greenland as an undergraduate at the University of Colorado Boulder, helping his professor, Konrad Steffen, install automated weather stations.

== Views ==
Box has said that humanity has likely already set in motion 21 m (69 feet) of sea level rise as a result of the burning of fossil fuels. He protested against the construction of the Keystone XL pipeline in 2011, and signed a letter to President Obama urging him not to approve it, which was sent earlier that year and was also signed by James Hansen and Peter Gleick. In 2013, Box's prediction of complete Greenland surface melting, which was later proven correct, received attention when it was covered by Bill McKibben in Rolling Stone. His research into this area was based on observations of Greenland, which revealed that its ice was becoming increasingly dark. In 2014, Box traveled to Greenland, where he discovered that the ice there was exceptionally dark, with Box saying that he was "stunned" when he saw it. That summer, after hearing about the ship Oden finding methane in the Arctic, Box tweeted, "If even a small fraction of Arctic sea floor carbon is released to the atmosphere, we're fucked." This tweet was covered extensively by the media. Thomas Painter of NASA's Jet Propulsion Laboratory has said that Box "...has one very important quality as a scientist;" namely, that he "is willing to say crazy stuff and push the boundaries of conventional wisdom."

== Media appearances ==
Box's work is featured in the movie Chasing Ice. He was interviewed by Ann Curry of NBC in April 2014, and appeared on Real Time with Bill Maher in July 2014.
