= NEEM Camp =

Research facility on the northern Greenland Ice Sheet

Location of NEEM Camp within Northeast Greenland National Park

NEEM Camp was a small research facility on the northern Greenland Ice Sheet, used as a base for ice core drilling. It was located about 313 km east of the closest coast, Peabody Bay in northern Greenland, 275 km northwest of the historical ice sheet camp North Ice, and 484 km east-northeast of Siorapaluk, the closest settlement. There was one heavy-duty tent for accommodation of the researchers during summer. Access was by skiway (snow runway).

The acronym NEEM stands for North Greenland Eemian Ice Drilling. The ice at the NEEM coring location (77°27'N 51°3.6'W) was predicted to be 2545 m thick.

Drilling started at NEEM in June 2009 and drillers expected to hit bedrock in 2010. The drilling progressed well and reached through the brittle zone (~800 m) in mid-July 2009. The plan was to process the ice below the brittle zone, per decision at the steering committee meeting in November 2008 in Copenhagen.

By September 1, 2009, the coring had reached 1757.84 m for this season, setting a single-season deep ice core drilling record in 100 days.

On July 26, 2010, drilling reached bedrock at 2537.36 m.

The November/December 2007 issue of MIT Technology Review magazine and its website carried a report on early efforts to establish this camp. The research goal is to seek preserved ice from the Eemian, which included a warming period in Earth's history.

After the conclusion of the drilling activities, the machinery and dome of the NEEM camp was moved to a new location in the NEEM-EastGRIP traverse, forming the EastGRIP camp at location 75.63°N 35.99°W in 2015.

== See also ==
- List of research stations in the Arctic
- Renland
- Summit Camp
