= Screw extractor =

Tool for removing broken or seized screws

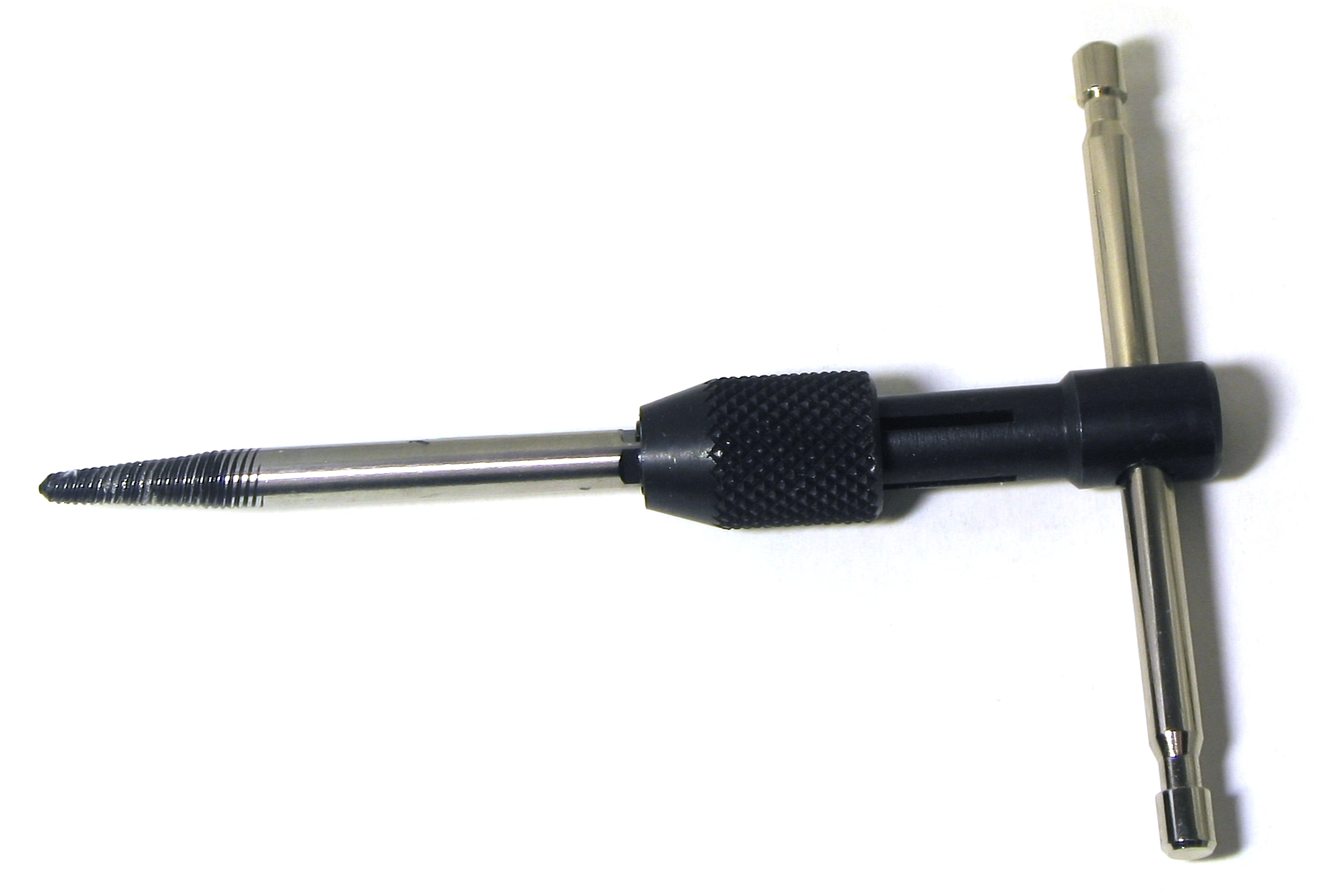
A screw extractor held in a tap wrench

A screw extractor is a tool for removing broken or seized screws. There are two types: one has a spiral flute structure, commonly called an easy out after the trademarked name EZ-Out; the other has a straight flute structure.

Screw extractors are intentionally made of hard, brittle steel, and, if too much torque is applied, can break off inside the screw that is being removed.

== Types ==
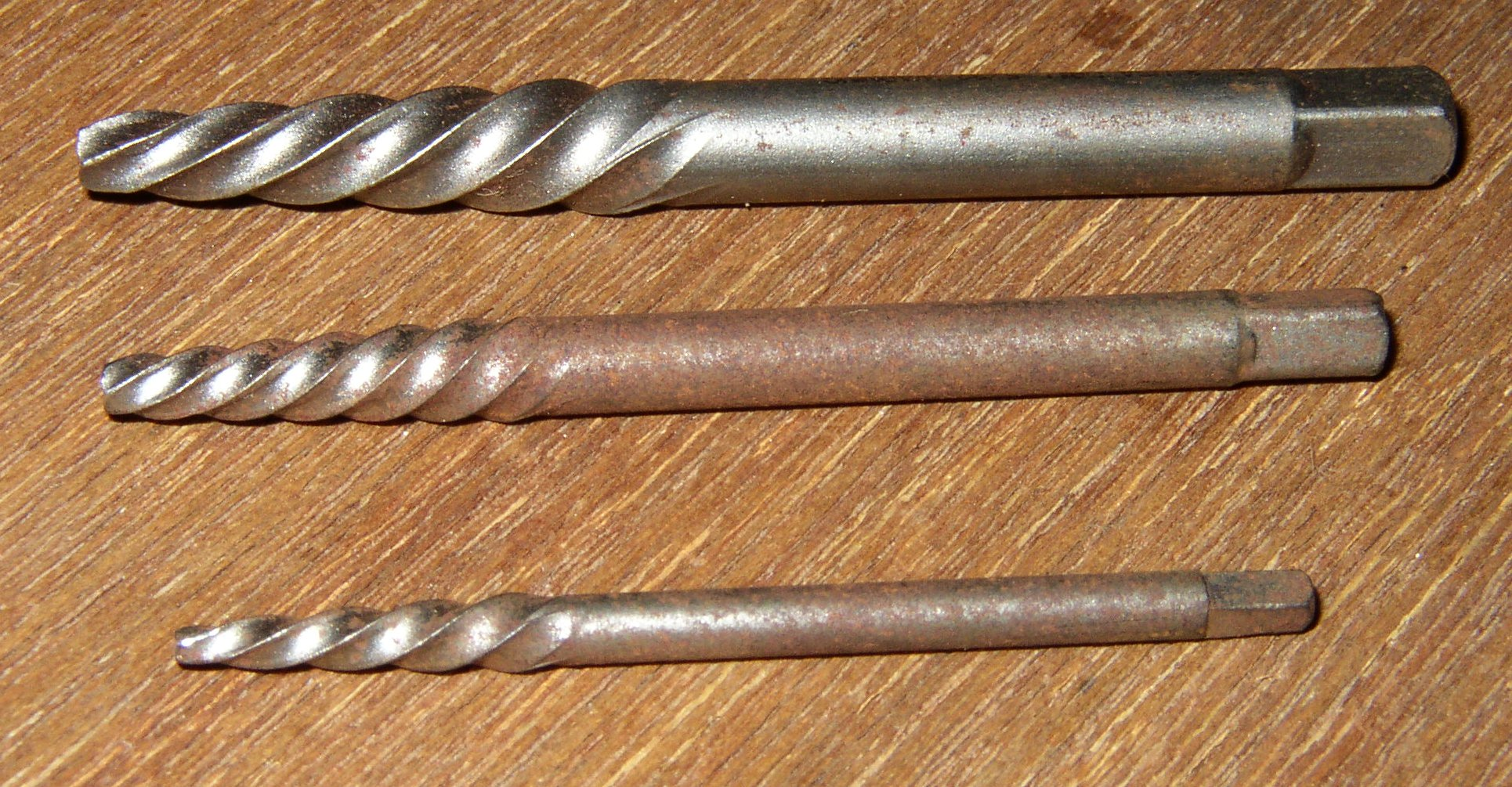
Spiral flute screw extractors

A spiral screw extractor is itself a coarse-pitched tapered screw thread. They are generally left-handed, for use on right-handed threads, though there are right-handed extractors for removing left-handed screws. The screw is first drilled out to the proper diameter for that extractor. The extractor is then inserted into this hole and turned in the direction opposing the stuck screw's original one, usually using a tap wrench. As the extractor is turned, the flutes on the tool dig into the screw, causing it to lock tightly and withstand the applied torque required to remove the screw. A drawback to tapered screw extractors is that their wedge action tends to expand the drilled, and thus weakened, screw. This wedging action can lock the screw even more tightly in place, making it difficult or impossible to extract.

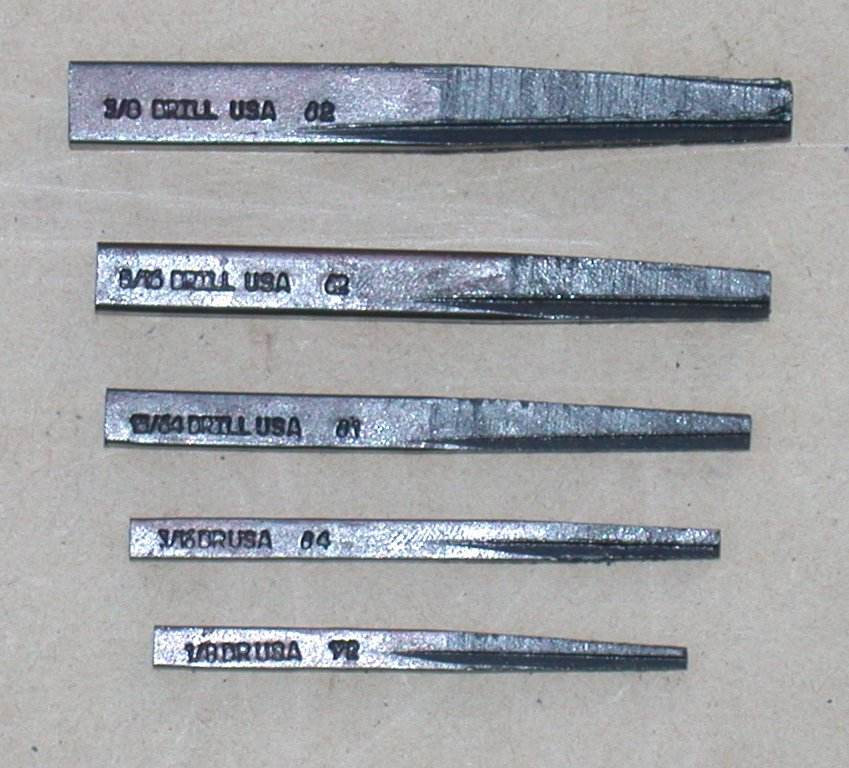
Square flute screw extractors

Straight fluted extractors may come in a kit that also has associated drills, drill bushings, and special nuts, or be sold individually. The screw is drilled out with the appropriate drill and drill bushing. The extractor is then hammered into the hole with a brass hammer, because a steel hammer is more likely to cause the extractor to break. The appropriate special nut is then attached to the end of the extractor. The nuts can then be turned with a wrench to remove the screw. Straight fluted extractors have less wedging effect than tapered screw extractors, so have less tendency to lock the screws into place. A further form is a parallel fluted extractor, with no taper at all and thus no wedging. These work well, but have the drawback of requiring the pilot hole to be drilled to a precise size. This size is often non-standard for most drill sets, requiring a dedicated drill bit to be supplied with the kit.

== Bolts ==
A tool analogous to a screw extractor, but for removing a seized or rounded off nut from a bolt, is a nut extractor, which has tapered, spiral flutes like a screw extractor, but located internally in the tool, not externally. These flutes or grooves grip the rounded nut from the outside, rather than being driven into the hollowed out screw shaft and taking hold of it internally as a screw extractor would.

Another tool for a stuck nut on a bolt, but not a screw, is a nut splitter.
