= ITASE =

Scientific research platform

The International Trans-Antarctic Scientific Expedition (ITASE) was created in 1990 with the purpose of studying climate change through research conducted in Antarctica. Antarctica was chosen as the optimal site to study the atmosphere because of its remote location and relatively undisturbed environment. Research in many fields has been conducted in Antarctica through ITASE, including astronomy, atmospheric sciences, biology, earth sciences, environmental science, geology, glaciology, marine biology, oceanography, and geophysics.

== History ==
A 1990 meeting held in Grenoble, France, served as a site of discussion regarding national ice coring efforts and the possibility of international collaboration between the world's top scientists. As a result, nineteen nations worldwide, including Australia, Brazil, Canada, China, France, Germany, Italy, Japan, Norway, Russia, Sweden, Switzerland, the U.K. and the United States, teamed up to study the surface and subsurface record of Antarctica's ice cores. These countries agreed that an understanding of Antarctica's climate and atmospheric composition (gathered through ice core examination) would provide greater insight into the understanding of climate change on a global level.

The ITASE Planning Document was formally recommended to XXII SCAR (Scientific Committee for Antarctic Research) in a 1992 meeting in Bariloche, Argentina, by the Working Group on Glaciology. The SCAR officials approved this preliminary implementation of the ITASE project, naming it “Recommendation Glaciology XXII-5.” SCAR allowed ITASE to contribute to its six main initiatives regarding Antarctica, and further accepted ITASE under one of its primary initiatives, GLOCHANT (Global Change in Antarctica) during the XXIII SCAR meeting in Cambridge, England. ITASE was also adopted as a Past Global Changes (PAGES) project in 1993.

The ITASE project reached its culmination in a workshop in Cambridge, U.K., during August 2–3, 1996. The US ITASE Science and Implementation Plan was published a few months before, in May, following a US ITASE workshop in Baltimore, Maryland.

== Objective ==
Because Antarctica has played a major role in global systems (i.e. atmosphere, biosphere, hydrosphere, etc.) scientists hoped to expand on the little knowledge of Antarctica's complex climate that was available. This data was collected primarily during the past 30 to 40 years. High resolution ice cores have been recognized, since, as the most direct and reliable record of the “soluble, insoluble and gaseous components of the atmosphere at resolutions as fine as seasonal and, potentially, on time scales as long as a million years” (International). Through ice core analysis, scientists are able to study past environments on earth and, more importantly, predict future environmental trends. Ice cores formed from polar glaciers generally contain the best preserved records of all geographic locations. Substances transported by the atmosphere and trapped within glacial ice reveal factors that cause environmental change as well as global responses to this change.

Results from deep ice core studies conducted in Greenland correspond with results of these Antarctic studies. Similar changes in parameters such as temperature, snow accumulation, wind-blown dust, sea-salt loading and methane composition indicate global climatic trends – that conclusions made from studies done in Antarctica may very well apply to the entire globe.
