= East Greenland Ice-Core Project =

Coordinates: 75.6332°N 35.9829°W

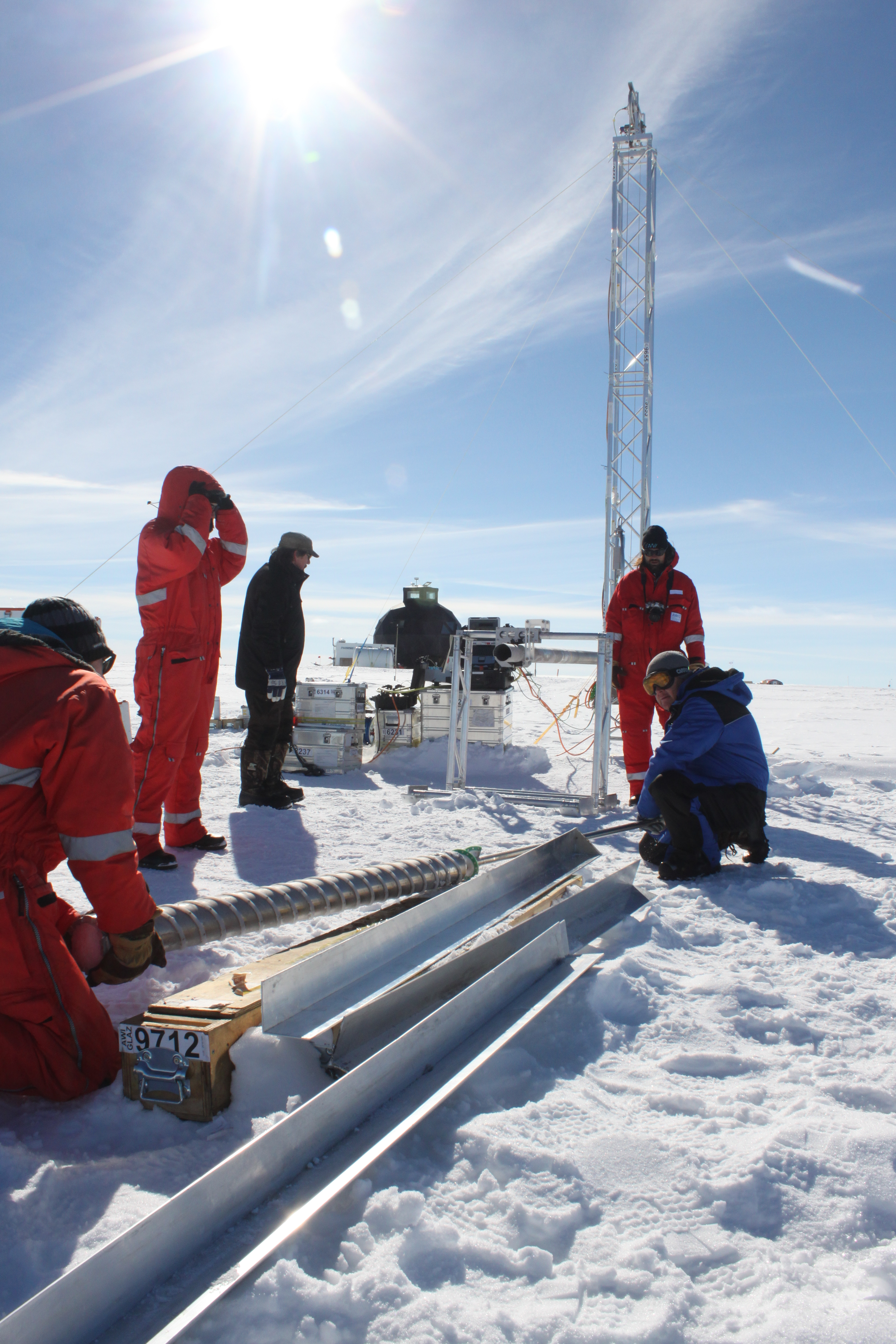
Ice core researchers from AWI drilling at the EastGRIP ice core site

The East Greenland Ice-Core Project, known as EGRIP, is a scientific project that plans to retrieve an ice core from the Northeast Greenland ice stream. The first season in the field was 2015; the project was expected to be drilling through to the base of the ice sheet by 2020.

Much of the camp set up for the North Greenland Eemian Ice Drilling Project (NEEM) was moved to the EGRIP location in 2015. The equipment was towed by several tractors. The team ran low on fuel and had to abandon some equipment, arriving at the EGRIP location on 26 May, after nine days of towing.

In March 2020, the 2020 EGRIP field campaign was cancelled due to the ongoing COVID-19 pandemic. The 2021 field season was also cancelled. EastGRIP reopened for field work in 2022, where the CryoEgg reached new depths in the ice, under pressures in excess of 200 bar and temperatures of around -30c.
