= Tap wrench =

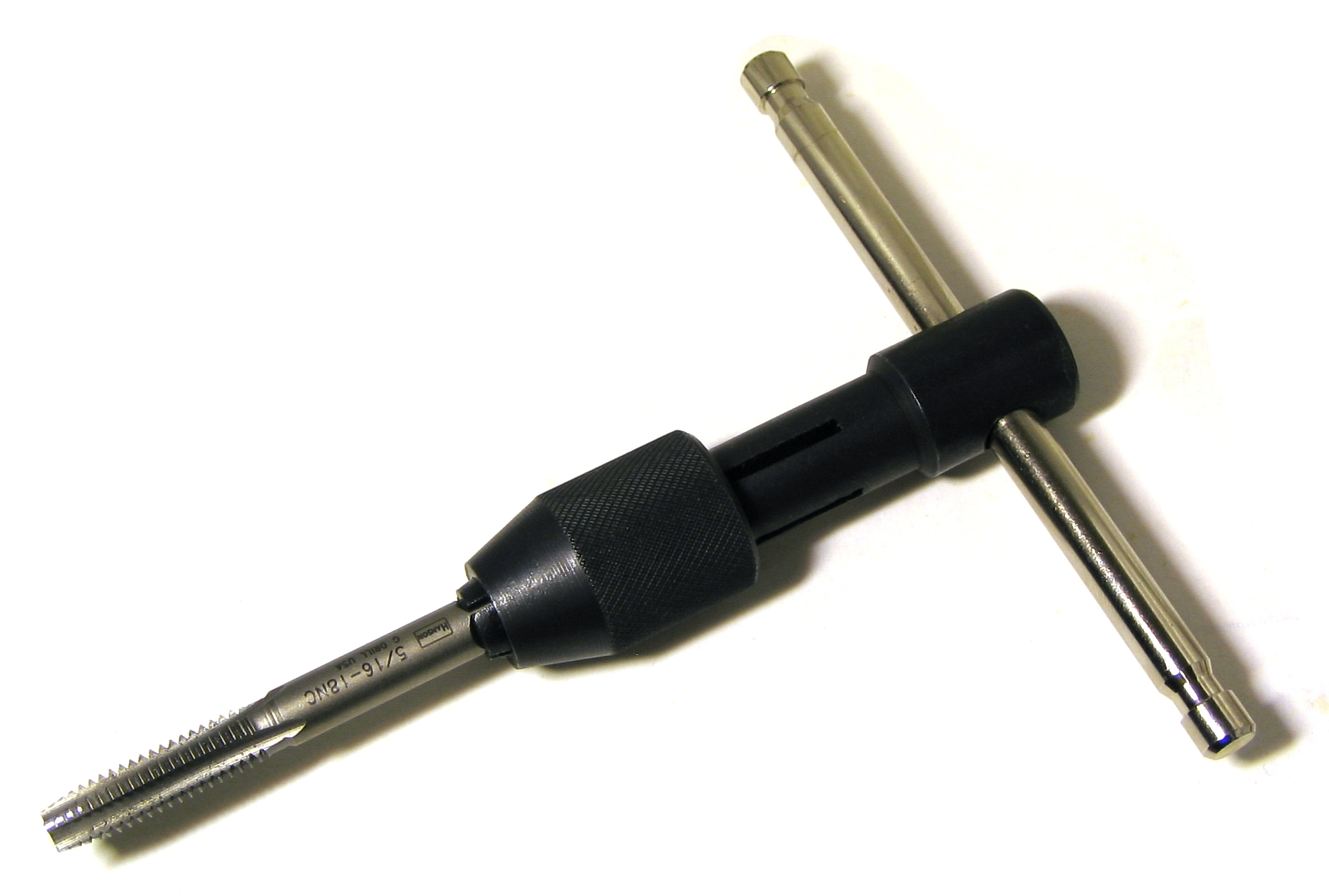
A tap and "T" wrench

A tap wrench is a hand tool used to turn taps or other small tools, such as hand reamers and screw extractors.

== Types ==
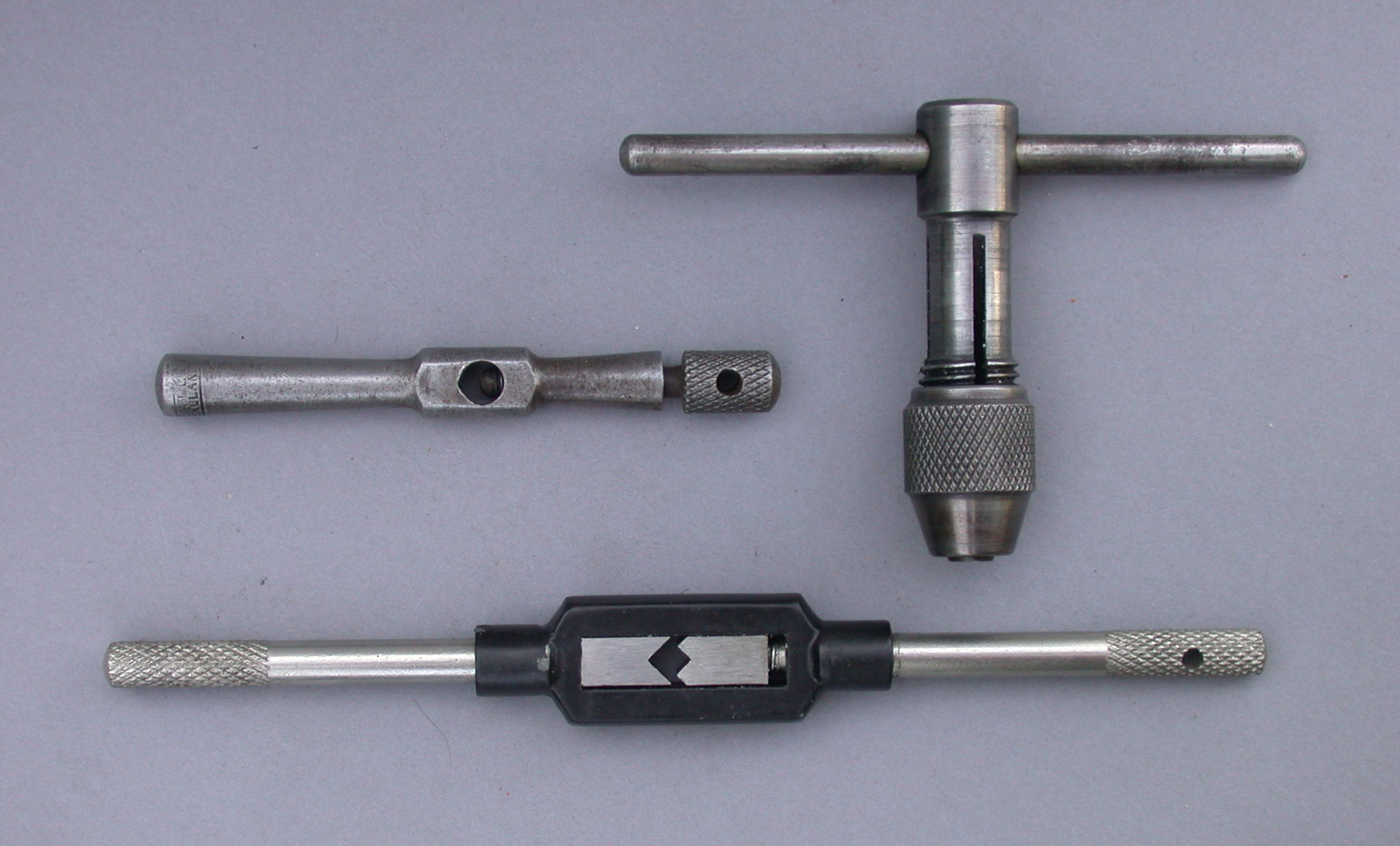
Two double-end adjustable tap wrenches and a T-handle tap wrench

There are two main types of tap wrenches: double-end adjustable wrenches and T-handle wrenches. Double-end adjustable wrenches, also known as bar wrenches, have one threaded handle which is attached to one of the clamps. The clamp is opened to insert the tool and then tightened down against the tool to secure it. This type of tap wrench is used with larger taps and where there is room to turn a larger wrench.

A T-handle is more compact. This type of wrench uses a collet to secure the tool. The collet design has two pieces: a threaded "nosecap" and four collet fingers; the collet fingers thread on the outside and the nosecap is screwed onto them. The nosecap is tapered, which causes the fingers to clamp onto the tool. This style tap wrench is useful in confined spaces or where extra reach is required. The hole which forms the collet fingers may be graduated/ sloped or may be stepped (i.e., have multiple diameters, usually two). The former accommodates a wide range of taps, but does not hold any of them with special security; the latter will accommodate two different sizes of taps (only) but will hold either with exceptional strength.

Numerous sizes of tap wrenches are required to cover the available size range of tool heads. Generally speaking, the smallest size which accommodates the tool head is recommended because it reduces the risk of breakage from excessive force.
