= Carl-Gustaf Rossby Research Medal =

Award for atmospheric science

The Carl-Gustaf Rossby Research Medal is the highest award for atmospheric science of the American Meteorological Society. It is presented to individual scientists, who receive a medal. Named in honor of meteorology and oceanography pioneer Carl-Gustaf Rossby, who was also its second (1953) recipient.

== Previous names ==
The prize was initially called Award for Extraordinary Scientific Achievement. In 1958 it was renamed The Carl-Gustaf Rossby Award for Extraordinary Scientific Achievement, and after 1963, its current name.

== Recipients ==
Source: American Meteorological Society (Enter award name and click "submit")

Year	Recipient	Citation
1951	Hurd Curtis Willett	For his contributions to dynamic meteorology leading to a better understanding of atmospheric motions and thermodynamics.
1953	Carl-Gustaf Rossby	For his contributions to dynamic meteorology leading to a better understanding of atmospheric motions and thermodynamics.
1955	Jerome Namias	For his contributions to, and stimulation of, research in the principles and application of extended and long-range forecasting techniques.
1956	John von Neumann	For his farsighted contribution to the science of meteorology and the national interests in developing the modern, high-speed electronic computer with meteorological application as an ultimate aim, and for his support and encouragement in organizing the world's first research group in numerical weather prediction.
1960	J. Bjerknes and Erik Palmén	For their pioneering and distinguished research contributions in atmospheric dynamics and synoptic aerology, which have given a unified picture of the general circulation of the atmosphere.
1961	Victor P. Starr	For his more than a decade of outstanding fundamental research leading to a better understanding of the general circulation of the atmosphere.
1962	Bernhard Haurwitz	For the substantial advances due to his research in dynamic meteorology over a wide range of subjects, including among many the long waves in the westerlies, the circulation of the high atmosphere, local and diurnal effects, and hurricanes.
1963	Harry Wexler (posthumously)	For his contributions to knowledge of the atmosphere heat balance and dynamic anticyclogenesis, for his interdisciplinary studies in meteorology, oceanography, and glaciology, and for his outstanding leadership in international programs in the atmospheric sciences.
1964	Jule G. Charney	For his long and distinguished record of outstanding contributions to theoretical meteorology and related atmospheric sciences. Apart from acting as a strong scientific stimulus to the development of dynamical weather prediction, Professor Charney's research has led the way to a more fundamental understanding of the atmosphere's general circulation, hydrodynamical instability, the structure of hurricanes, the dynamics of ocean currents, the propagation of wave energy, and many other aspects of geophysical fluid mechanics. In its scientific depth and breadth, Professor Charney's work has contributed significantly to the study of meteorology as an exact science.
1965	Arnt Eliassen	For his many important contributions to dynamical meteorology, through which he has brought a new elegance and clarity into the subject. Noteworthy among these are his research on free and thermally driven circulations, on numerical weather prediction, on frontogenesis, and on shear and gravitational–acoustic wave propagation in stratified media.
1966	Zdenek Sekera	For his numerous contributions to the dynamics of the atmosphere, which comprise studies of waves at interfaces, of the dynamics of the atmospheric jet stream, and especially of the brightness and polarization of sky light in a scattering atmosphere which led to the extension and application of Chandrasekhar's general theory of radiative transfer to atmospheric problems. This work led to the computation of tables by Sekera and his coworkers. With the publication of these tables, in Chandrasekhar's words, 'The problem that was formulated by Rayleigh in 1871 has now at last found its complete solution.
1967	Dave Fultz	For his outstanding and pioneering research over the past 20 years, which has resulted in laboratory experimental techniques in dynamic meteorology. Through example and personal instruction, these techniques have been the root of nearly all of the modeling studies of the general circulation that have been carried out to date.
1968	Verner E. Suomi	For his imagination, ingenuity, and versatility in conceiving and designing diverse meteorological sensors which have helped to transform the satellite as a meteorological probe from a dream to a reality. His Spin-Scan camera has given us our most comprehensive views of the atmosphere as an entity, and has already led to revised ideas concerning the circulation in lower latitudes.
1969	Edward N. Lorenz	For his fundamental innovations in dynamic meteorology and his enlightening perspectives in advancing our understanding of the atmosphere as a physical system.
1970	Hsiao-Lan Kuo	For his fundamental research in atmospheric dynamics, beginning with his thesis on the stability of barotropic flow and continuing on the general circulation, the theory of hurricane formation, thermal convection, interaction of the atmosphere with the earth's surface, and on many other topics of great importance.
1971	Norman A. Phillips	For his introduction of new lines of study which have served to enlarge the scope of dynamic meteorology, his construction of a two-layer model making numerical prediction of developing systems feasible, and his diagnosis of nonlinear instability and prescription for dealing with it, permitting numerical simulation of the general circulation, which he had previously pioneered to be extended to infinite range.
1972	Joseph Smagorinsky	For his creative leadership in numerical modeling of the general circulation of the atmosphere.
1973	Christian E. Junge	For his productive investigations and international leadership in the study of atmospheric aerosols and atmospheric chemistry that have increased our knowledge of the stratospheric sulphate layer, the background tropospheric aerosol, the intricacies of marine aerosol distribution, and other topics important to the chemical budgets of the atmosphere.
1974	Heinz H. Lettau	For his outstanding research achievements leading to a fuller understanding of the atmosphere's first mile. From his original concept of the stability length scale to his pioneering contributions in boundary-layer dynamics, turbulent transfer, climatology, and microscale surface modification, his work has been characterized by remarkable ingenuity and extraordinary dedication to purpose.
1975	Charles H. B. Priestley	For his fundamental contributions to the understanding of turbulent processes and the links between small-scale and large-scale dynamics in the atmosphere.
1976	Hans A. Panofsky	For his many fundamental contributions to the understanding of turbulent processes and the links between small-scale and large-scale dynamics in the atmosphere.
1977	Akio Arakawa	For his formulation of physically realistic methods to incorporate convective clouds and boundary-layer processes into large-scale prediction models of the atmosphere and for his contributions in numerical methods of weather prediction.
1978	James W. Deardorff	For his imaginative research on the structure of the convective atmospheric boundary layer and its applications to prediction models and diffusion.
1979	Herbert Riehl	For his outstanding analyses of tropical phenomena, ranging from studies of individual clouds, tropical depressions, and hurricanes, to the trade-wind inversion and the Hadley circulation. These studies have greatly advanced our understanding of a major portion of the atmosphere.
1980	Sean A. Twomey	For extensive contributions to the development of many areas of atmospheric science, including aerosol and cloud physics, radiative transfer, and remote sensing from satellites.
1981	Roscoe R. Braham, Jr.	For his notable contributions in research and effective leadership in the study of complex convective systems.
1982	Cecil E. Leith, Jr.	For his fundamental contributions to the theory of statistical hydrodynamics and its application to the assessment of weather and climate predictability.
1983	Joanne Simpson	For her outstanding contributions to our understanding of convective clouds, and the role of convection in the formation and maintenance of hurricanes and other wind systems over tropical oceans.
1984	Bert R. Bolin	For his outstanding research enlarging our understanding of the atmosphere and oceans as a milieu, for valuable contributions to the understanding of global geochemical cycles, and for his international leadership in scientific planning of the Global Atmospheric Research Programme.
1985	Tiruvalam N. Krishnamurti	For fundamental contributions to the understanding of the structure and evolution of the tropical atmosphere, especially the monsoons, and for international leadership in the Global Atmospheric Research Programme.
1986	Douglas K. Lilly	For sustained contributions and skilled leadership in establishing the scientific foundations of small- and mesoscale meteorology including convection, gravity waves, and boundary layer turbulence.
1987	Michael E. McIntyre	For his original and innovative works furthering our theoretical and conceptual understanding of the stratosphere.
1988	Brian J. Hoskins	For numerous major contributions to numerical modeling and to the understanding of atmospheric dynamics.
1989	Richard J. Reed	For major contributions to our understanding of polar lows, tropical waves, and the tropical lower stratosphere.
1990	Yale Mintz	For preeminent leadership in the global modeling of climate, and for inspiring tutelage of several generations of scientists.
1991	Kikuro Miyakoda	For outstanding contributions toward extending the time range of numerical weather prediction to weeks, months, and seasons.
1992	Syukuro Manabe	For his contributions to the understanding of climate dynamics and his pioneering role in numerical prediction of climate change.
1993	John M. Wallace	For innovative and consequential contributions to the understanding of large-scale atmospheric circulations.
1994	Jerry D. Mahlman	For pioneering work in the application of general circulation models to the understanding of stratospheric dynamics and transport.
1995	Chester W. Newton	For fundamental research contributions in the areas of the structure and dynamics of jet streams, fronts, cyclones, severe storms, and mesoconvective systems; and the behavior of the general circulation of the atmosphere.
1996	David Atlas	For brilliant and sustained leadership in the field of radar meteorology, for important contributions to cloud physics and mesoscale meteorology, and for inspiring new generations of scientists in these fields.
1997	Robert E. Dickinson	For his wide-ranging and important contributions to atmospheric dynamics and to earth system science.
1998	Barry Saltzman	For his lifelong contributions to the study of the global circulation and the evolution of the earth's climate.
1999	Taroh Matsuno	For fundamental contributions to the theory of waves and wave mean flow interaction in geophysical systems.
2000	Susan Solomon	For fundamental contributions to understanding the chemistry of the stratosphere and unraveling the mystery of the Antarctic ozone hole.
2001	James R. Holton	For outstanding advances in the dynamics of the stratosphere through theoretical advances, perceptive use of models, and contributions to key measurement programs.
2002	V. Ramanathan	For fundamental insights into the radiative roles of clouds, aerosols, and key gases in the earth's climate system.
2003	Keith A. Browning	For leadership in international programs and synthesis of observations and models dealing with synoptic and mesoscale systems, and for pioneering research on short-range forecasting.
2004	Peter J. Webster	For enduring contributions to understanding the general circulation of the tropical atmosphere-ocean system, through insightful research and exemplary scientific leadership.
2005	Jagdish Shukla	For fundamental contributions and inspired leadership in understanding the variability and predictability of the climate system on seasonal-to-international time scales.
2006	Robert A. Houze	For fundamental and enduring contributions towards the understanding of the broad spectrum of precipitation systems, their interactions with larger scale circulations, and for his leadership of field programs.
2007	Kerry Andrew Emanuel	For fundamental contributions to the science of moist convection that have led to a new and deeper understanding of tropical cyclones, midlatitude weather systems, and climate dynamics.
2008	Isaac M. Held	For fundamental insights into the dynamics of the Earth's climate through studies of idealized dynamical models and comprehensive climate simulations.
2009	James E. Hansen	For outstanding contributions to climate modeling, understanding climate change forcings and sensitivity, and for clear communication of climate science in the public arena.
2010	Tim Palmer	For fundamental contributions to understanding the role of nonlinear processes in the predictability of weather and climate, and for developing tools for estimating such predictability.
2011	Joseph B. Klemp	For illuminating the dynamics of mountain waves and thunderstorms, and for his contributions to improvements in numerical techniques and community models.
2012	John C. Wyngaard	For outstanding contributions to measuring, simulating, and understanding atmospheric turbulence.
2013	Dennis L. Hartmann	For significant contributions to the synthesis of knowledge of radiative and dynamical processes leading to a deeper understanding of the climate system.
2014	Owen Brian Toon	For fundamental contributions toward understanding the role of clouds and aerosols in the climates of Earth and other planets.
2015	Bin Wang 王斌	For creative insights leading to important advances in the understanding of tropical and monsoonal processes and their predictability.
2016	Edward J. Zipser	For fundamental contributions to tropical meteorology through insightful analysis of observed moist convective systems, and for sustained leadership in airborne field programs.
2017	Richard Rotunno	For elegant, rigorous work that has fundamentally increased our understanding of mesoscale and synoptic-scale dynamics, especially the role of vorticity in the atmosphere.
2018	Kuo-Nan Liou	For intellectual leadership and seminal contributions to improving the theory and application of atmospheric radiative transfer and its interactions with clouds and aerosols.
2019	Inez Y. Fung	For fundamental and pioneering contributions to understanding biosphere-atmosphere interactions through modeling and data assimilation approaches to synthesizing surface and space-based measurements.
2020	Julia M. Slingo	For cutting-edge research on the physics and dynamics of the tropical atmosphere, leading to significant advances in seamless weather and climate modeling.
2021	David S. Battisti	For original, insightful contributions to understanding climate variability for phenomena ranging from the El Nino/Southern Oscillation and the Pacific Decadal Oscillation to paleoclimate.
2022	Venkatachalam Ramaswamy	For original and highly influential leadership providing fundamental insight into radiative-climate interaction among greenhouse gases, aerosols and clouds.
2023	Bruce Albrecht	For fundamental contributions to the measurement and understanding of boundary layer clouds and the turbulent and microphysical processes controlling them.
2024	Benjamin Santer	For outstanding contributions to comprehending how climate change affects atmospheric structure and behavior based on detection and attribution methods.
2025	Graeme Stephens	For breakthroughs in understanding how radiation, clouds, and precipitation shape climate system feedbacks by driving the design of innovative Earth observation platforms and their applications.
2026	Wayne H. Schubert	For fundamental and sustained research on the theoretical understanding of moist atmospheric processes, hurricanes, and geophysical fluid dynamics and their representation in numerical models.

== See also ==
- List of meteorology awards
- List of prizes named after people
