= Jule G. Charney Award =

Award given by the American Meteorological Society

The Jule G. Charney Award is the American Meteorological Society's award granted to "individuals in recognition of highly significant research or development achievement in the atmospheric or hydrologic sciences". The prize was originally known as the Second Half Century Award, and first awarded to mark to fiftieth anniversary of the society.

It is named after the meteorologist Jule G. Charney, who played a key role in developing weather prediction.

== Recipients ==
Source: American Meteorological Society

- 2024 Richard Seager. For significant and innovative contributions in the attribution of past droughts and floods, and to understanding the impact of rising greenhouse gases on future hydroclimate.
- 2023 Dale Durran. For fundamental contributions to mountain meteorology through the understanding and numerical simulation of orographically modified flow.
- 2022 George Kiladis. For original, insightful contributions in understanding the codependency of tropical dynamics and convection.
- 2021 Clara Deser. For fundamental insights into the structure, genesis, and predictability of decadal variability in the atmosphere, ocean, and cryosphere.
- 2020 Qiang Fu. For pioneering contributions to the theory and practice of atmospheric radiative transfer and its critical linkages to climate and climate change.
- 2019 J. David Neelin. For fundamental contributions to understanding tropical climate dynamics and the impact of anthropogenic forcing on precipitation, drying, circulation, and extremes.
- 2018 Dennis P. Lettenmaier. For fundamental and visionary research on the hydrological impacts of climate change, and the pioneering development of land surface models and continental-to-global scale data sets.
- 2017 David J. Raymond. For profound insights into the interaction between atmospheric convection and the larger-scale environment.
- 2016 Wayne H. Schubert. For landmark advances in theoretical understanding of convective parameterization, marine stratocumulus, balanced atmospheric flows, and tropical cyclone intensity and structure.
- 2015 Alan Robock. For fundamental contributions toward understanding the climatic effects of stratospheric aerosols from volcanoes and other potential sources, and the role of soil moisture in climate.
- 2014 David A. Randall. For transformative research into atmospheric convection and cloud processes and their improved representation in global weather and climate models.
- 2013 R. Alan Plumb. For fundamental contributions to the understanding of geophysical fluid dynamics, stratospheric dynamics, chemical transport, and the general circulation of the atmosphere and oceans.
- 2012 Christopher S. Bretherton. For fundamental contributions to our understanding of atmospheric moist convection, particularly the discovery of mechanisms governing the transition from stratocumulus to shallow cumulus convection.
- 2011 Ronald B. Smith. For fundamental contributions to our understanding of the influence of mountains on the atmosphere through both theoretical advances and insightful observations.
- 2010 Eric F. Wood. For pioneering contributions to understanding the role of land surface heterogeneity in the coupled water and energy balance of the Earth surface.
- 2009 Warren M. Washington and Gerald A. Meehl. For outstanding collaborative contributions to modeling climate and its response to anthropogenic and natural forcings.
- 2008 Gerald R. North. For groundbreaking research on climate models, atmospheric statistics, and satellite mission development.
- 2007 Alan K. Betts. For his pioneering and sustained contributions to the understanding of the atmospheric boundary layer, cumulus convection, and land-surface-atmosphere interactions.
- 2006 Robert D. Cess. For his outstanding contributions to our understanding of the science of atmospheric radiation and climate change and the role of clouds in climate models
- 2005 Graeme Stephens. For pioneering advances in understanding and measuring radiation processes and their role in climate
- 2004 Richard Rotunno. For highly significant, scholarly contributions to understanding the dynamics that govern a wide spectrum of mesoscale phenomena and processes
- 2003 Wilfried H. Brutsaert. For fundamental and far-reaching contributions to our understanding of the linkages between Earth's atmosphere and land surface
- 2002 Roland A. Madden. For pioneering investigations of global-scale waves and of the intraseasonal oscillation
- 2001 Roger Daley. For highly significant research and development in data assimilation, modeling, and numerical weather prediction
- 2000 Kevin Edward Trenberth. For improving our understanding of the dynamics of the climate system through diagnostic analyses of its fundamental properties
- 1999 Anthony Hollingsworth. For penetrating research on four-dimensional data assimilation systems and numerical models.
- 1998 Kuo-Nan Liou. For his pioneering work in the theory and application of radiative transport and its interaction with clouds.
- 1997 Timothy N. Palmer. For fundamental contributions to the theory and practice of extended weather prediction and the understanding of climate phenomena.
- 1996 Yoshio Kurihara. For fundamental modeling research on tropical storm dynamics and a major advance in operational hurricane forecasting.
- 1995 Eugenia Kalnay. For many applications of numerical experimentation in explaining the physical processes of atmospheric dynamics and for developing improved operational numerical forecast models.
- 1994 William M. Gray. For pioneering contributions to the understanding and forecasting of tropical cyclones.
- 1993 Abraham H. Oort. For wide-ranging studies of atmospheric behavior through comprehensive analysis of global observations.
- 1992 Lance F. Bosart. For his demonstrations that valuable insights can be obtained by careful analysis of routine meteorological observations.
- 1991 Moustafa T. Chahine. For outstanding contributions to satellite sensing through better understanding of the inverse radiative transfer problem and development of its applications.
- 1991 M. Patrick McCormick. For outstanding contributions to satellite sensing through development of solar occultation instruments and for elucidation of the nature of polar stratospheric clouds.
- 1990 Peter J. Webster. For fundamental contributions to the understanding of low-frequency tropical circulations and tropical/midlatitude interactions.
- 1990 Melvin A. Shapiro. For extraordinary achievements in aircraft probing of mesoscale phenomena, and for meso- and synoptic-scale analyses of unsurpassed quality.
- 1989 Eugene M. Rasmusson. For major contributions to climate diagnostics, especially of the relationship of the Southern Oscillation to climate anomalies.
- 1988 Robert Dickinson. For outstanding contributions to our understanding of biofeedback processes.
- 1987 Richard A. Anthes. For his sustained contributions in theoretical and modeling studies related to tropical and mesoscale meteorology.
- 1986 Michia Yanai. For highly original contributions to enlarging our knowledge of the dynamics of the atmosphere, particularly in the tropics.
- 1985 Keith A. Browning for fundamental contributions to our understanding of severe convective storms, the kinematics of fronts and cyclonic storms, and the methodology of Doppler radar observations.
- 1985 Richard S. Lindzen. For incisive contributions to the theory of diverse phenomena ranging from gravitational to planetary waves in the upper and lower atmosphere.
- 1984 Peter V. Hobbs. For highly productive theoretical and field investigations of cloud physical processes, aerosol and cloud-water chemistry studies, and for his leadership in organizing and directing the CYCLES Project, which has contributed significantly toward our understanding of the mesoscale structure of midlatitude frontal systems.
- 1983 Francis P. Bretherton. For his innovative and significant contributions to our understanding of the dynamics of the atmosphere and oceans encompassing a wide variety of scales, processes, and phenomena.

== See also ==
- List of meteorology awards
