= Rossby (disambiguation) =

Carl-Gustaf Rossby (1898–1957) was a Swedish-born American meteorologist.

Rossby may also refer to:

- Rossby (crater), impact crater on Mars
- Rossby wave, a natural phenomenon in the atmosphere and oceans of planets
- Rossby number, a dimensionless number used in describing fluid flow. The Rossby number is the ratio of inertial
- Rossby parameter, used in geophysics and meteorology
- Rossby whistle, oscillation of sea-level and bottom pressure in the Caribbean Sea
