= Tropical cyclone seasonal forecasting =

Tropical cyclone seasonal forecasting is the process of predicting the number of tropical cyclones in one of the world's seven tropical cyclone basins during a particular tropical cyclone season. In the north Atlantic Ocean, one of the most widely publicized annual predictions comes from the Tropical Meteorology Project at Colorado State University. These reports are written by Philip J. Klotzbach and William M. Gray.

== Colorado State University's Tropical Meteorology Project ==
Since 1984, Dr. William M. Gray and his associates at the Colorado State University have issued a seasonal forecast, that has aimed to predict the number of tropical storms and hurricanes that will develop within the Atlantic basin during the upcoming season amongst other factors. The forecasts were initially issued ahead of time for June and August.

After the active 2005 Atlantic hurricane season, Dr Gray decided to allow Philip J. Klotzbach to take the primary responsibility for the project's seasonal, monthly and landfall probability forecasts effective with the first forecast for the 2006 Atlantic hurricane season.

== National Meteorological Services ==
Ahead of each season several national meteorological services issue forecasts of how many tropical cyclones will form during a season and/or how many tropical cyclones will affect a particular country. Examples include the United Kingdom's Met Office which issues a seasonal forecast in May/June of the number of tropical storms for the upcoming Atlantic hurricane season, while the Philippine Atmospheric, Geophysical and Astronomical Service tries to predict how many tropical cyclones will move into its area of responsibility.

=== United States National Oceanic and Atmospheric Administration ===
In August 1998, the United States Climate Prediction Center in conjunction with the National Hurricane Center and the Hurricane Research Division issued a tropical cyclone outlook, which accurately predicted that there would be an above-normal number of tropical storms and hurricanes in the Atlantic between August and October. The NOAA centres subsequently started to issue an outlook that gave a general guide to the expected overall activity within the Atlantic Ocean.

Ahead of the 2003 Pacific hurricane season, the NOAA forecasters decided to start issuing an experimental tropical cyclone outlook for the Eastern Pacific, which was designed not to be updated during the mid-season. As a result of both the 2003 and 2004 outlooks being successful, the predictions became an operational product during 2005.

NOAA is also one of the contributors to New Zealand's National Institute of Water & Atmospheric Research Tropical Cyclone Outlook, through its National Weather Service forecast offices in the region and the Climate Prediction Center.

=== Australia and the Pacific Islands ===
New Zealand's National Institute of Water & Atmospheric Research (NIWA) and collaborating agencies including the Meteorological Service of New Zealand and Pacific Island National Meteorological Services issue the "Island Climate Update Tropical Cyclone Outlook" for the Pacific. This forecast attempts to predict how many tropical cyclones and severe tropical cyclones will develop within the Southern Pacific between 135°E and 120°W as well as how many will affect a particular island nation. The Fiji Meteorological Service while collaborating with NIWA and partners also publishes its own seasonal forecast but for the South Pacific basin between 160°E and 120°W. Since the start of the 2009–10 season, the Australian Bureau of Meteorology's National Climate Center has publicly released a forecast for the Australian region which focused on the broadscale aspects of the cyclone season, and forecasted how likely it was that a subregion was to see activity above the average as well as how many tropical cyclones may occur within the basin and each of its subregions. However ahead of the 2011–12 season the NCC stopped forecasting publicly how many tropical cyclones may occur in a certain region and just forecasted how likely it was that a subregion was to see activity above the average.

== See also ==
- Tropical cyclone forecast model
- Numerical weather prediction
- Tropical cyclone observation
- Tropical cyclone warnings and watches
- Tropical Meteorology Project
