= Fultz =

Fultz is a surname. Notable people with the surname include:

- Aaron Fultz, baseball player
- Brent Fultz, American material scientist
- Dave Fultz, baseball player and college football coach
- Dave Fultz (meteorologist), American experimental meteorologist 1921-2002
- Frank Fultz, former strength and conditioning coach
- Jack Fultz, long-distance runner
- Markelle Fultz (born 1998), American basketball player

== See also ==
- Fultz House, one of the earliest houses in Lower Sackville, Nova Scotia
