= Roger Revelle Medal =

Robert A. Pritzker Distinguished Lecture Award
- Description: Premier honor conferred by the Biomedical Engineering Society recognizing biomedical engineering achievement
- Country: United States
- Presented by: Biomedical Engineering Society

The Roger Revelle Medal is given out annually by the American Geophysical Union to recognize "outstanding accomplishments or contributions toward the understanding of the Earth’s atmospheric processes, including its dynamics, chemistry, and radiation; and toward the role of the atmosphere, atmosphere-ocean coupling, or atmosphere-land coupling in determining the climate, biogeochemical cycles, or other key elements of the climate system". The award was created in 1991 and named after oceanographer Roger Revelle.

== Past recipients ==
The past recipients of the Roger Revelle Medal are:

- 1992 - Edward N. Lorenz
- 1993 - Syukuro Manabe
- 1994 - F. Sherwood Rowland
- 1995 - Wallace Broecker
- 1996 - Robert E. Dickinson
- 1997 - Hans A. Oeschger
- 1998 - Harold S. Johnston
- 1999 - John Michael Wallace
- 2000 - James R. Holton
- 2001 - James Hansen
- 2002 - Ralph J. Cicerone
- 2003 - Jean Jouzel
- 2004 - Inez Fung
- 2006 - John E. Kutzbach
- 2007 - Richard B. Alley
- 2008 - Michael L. Bender
- 2009 - Jorge L. Sarmiento
- 2010 - Pietre P. Tans
- 2011 - Owen Brian Toon
- 2012 - Steven C. Wofsy
- 2013 - Kuo-Nan Liou
- 2014 - Christopher Field
- 2015 - Anne M. Thompson
- 2016 - Ellen R.M. Druffel
- 2017 - Kevin Trenberth
- 2018 - Isaac Held
- 2019 - Eugenia Kalnay
- 2020 - Claire Parkinson
- 2021 - Clara Deser
- 2022 - Dennis L. Hartmann
- 2023 - Zhisheng An
- 2024 - Nicolas Gruber
- 2025 - Edward R. Cook

== See also ==
- List of geophysicists
- List of geophysics awards
- Prizes named after people
