= Horace R. Byers =

American meteorologist (1906–1998)

Horace Byers
- Born: March 12, 1906; Seattle, Washington, U.S.
- Died: May 22, 1998 (aged 92); Montecito, California, U.S.
- Education: University of California, Berkeley (A.B., 1929); Massachusetts Institute of Technology (M.S., 1932; Sc.D., 1935)
- Known for: Thunderstorm Project
- Scientific career
- Fields: Meteorology
- Workplaces: University of Chicago; Texas A&M University
- Thesis: The Changes in Air Masses During Lifting (1935)
- Doctoral advisor: Carl-Gustaf Rossby

Horace Robert Byers (March 12, 1906 – May 22, 1998) was an American meteorologist who pioneered in aviation meteorology, synoptic weather analysis (weather forecasting), severe convective storms, cloud physics, and weather modification. Byers is most well known for his work as director of U.S. Weather Bureau's Thunderstorm Project in which, among other things, the modern cell morphology and life cycle of a thunderstorm were established. He is also known for his professional involvement with Carl-Gustaf Arvid Rossby and Tetsuya Theodore Fujita. He invited Fujita to come to America in 1953.

== Biography ==
During high school Byers developed a strong interest in journalism and worked as a reporter around the San Francisco Bay area, full-time for a year after graduation and then part-time while at the University of California, Berkeley. At university he became acquainted with science in the geography department and chose atmospheric sciences as his career. He graduated with an A.B. degree in geography in 1929, afterward studying meteorology under Rossby and Hurd C. Willett at the Massachusetts Institute of Technology (MIT) on a fellowship from the Daniel Guggenheim Fund, receiving his M.S. in 1932 with the thesis The Air Masses of the North Pacific. In 1934 he earned an Alfred P. Sloan Fellowship to study meteorology, attaining his Sc.D. in 1935 with the dissertation The Changes in Air Masses During Lifting.

Byers joined the faculty of the University of Chicago in 1940, eventually helping establish the Department of Meteorology. There he developed internationally renowned work during his 25-year tenure, about half of that as chairperson of the department, including work on cloud seeding with Louis J. Battan. In 1965 he moved to Texas A&M University (TAMU) and was the first dean of geosciences until his retirement in 1974.

He was a member of the National Academy of Sciences (NAS), president of the American Meteorological Society (AMS), and the International Association of Meteorology and Atmospheric Physics (IAMAP).
