= José Peixoto =

José Peixoto may refer to:

- José Luís Peixoto (born 1974), Portuguese author, poet and playwright
- José Pinto Peixoto (1922–1996), Portuguese meteorologist
