= Klemp =

Klemp is a German surname. It stems from the male given name Clemens – and may refer to:

- Harold Klemp (1942), spiritual leader of Eckankar
- Joseph B. Klemp, American atmospheric scientist
- Pia Klemp (1983), German biologist and human rights activist
