= Wang Bin =

Wang Bin may refer to:

- Wang Bin (footballer), Chinese footballer
- Wang Bin (executive), Chinese business executive
- Bin Wang (meteorologist), Chinese meteorologist
- Tian Bing, born Wang Bin, Chinese wrestler
