= RWI =

RWI may refer to:

- Rusty Wallace, Inc, former name of Rusty Wallace Racing, a US NASCAR racing team
- Rheinisch-Westfälisches Institut für Wirtschaftsforschung, a German economics research institute in Essen
- IATA code of Rocky Mount–Wilson Regional Airport
- Rossby wave instability, concept related to astrophysical accretion discs
