= Carl-Gustaf Rossby =

Swedish-born American meteorologist

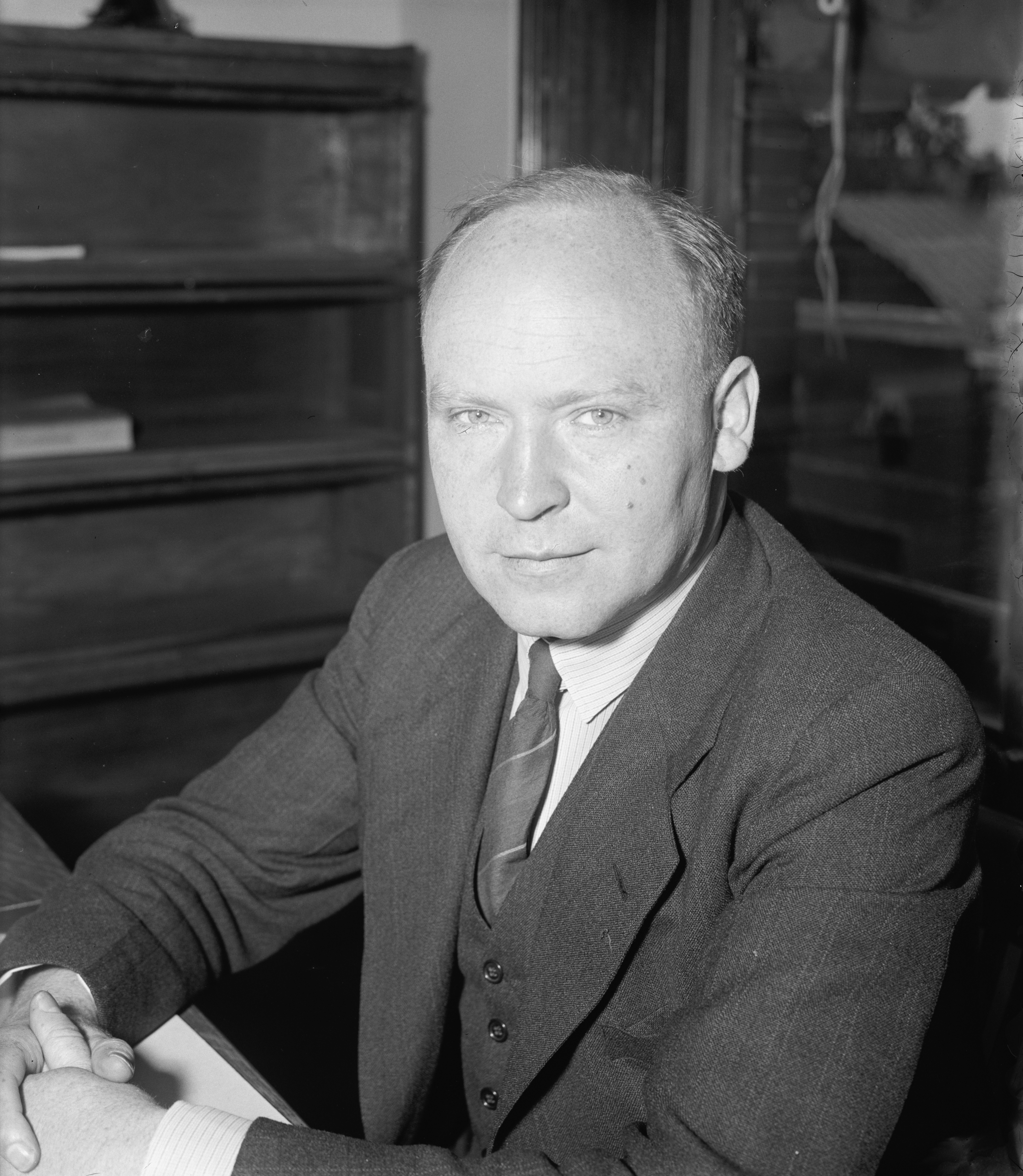
- Born: Carl-Gustaf Arvid Rossby; Stockholm, Sweden
- Died: August 19, 1957 (aged 58); Stockholm, Sweden
- Citizenship: Swedish; American (1939)
- Education: University of Leipzig; University of Bergen; Stockholm University (1925)
- Known for: Synoptic and dynamic meteorology, polar frontal theory, jet stream, atmospheric chemistry
- Awards: Carl-Gustaf Rossby Research Medal (inaugural); Symons Gold Medal (1953)
- Scientific career
- Fields: Meteorology; Physical oceanography Atmospheric chemistry
- Workplaces: Massachusetts Institute of Technology; University of Chicago; Woods Hole Oceanographic Institution; Swedish Meteorological and Hydrological Institute
- Doctoral advisor: Erik Ivar Fredholm
- Doctoral students: Chaim L. Pekeris; Horace R. Byers; Harry Wexler; Reid Bryson; Ye Duzheng; Hsiao-Lan Kuo; Joanne Malkus; Bert Bolin; Aksel C. Wiin-Nielsen; Victor P. Starr

Carl-Gustaf Arvid Rossby (Swedish pronunciation: [kɑːɭ ˈɡɵ̂sːtav ˈǎrːvɪd ˈrɔ̌sːbʏ] 28 December 1898 – 19 August 1957) was a Swedish-born American meteorologist who first explained the large-scale motions of the atmosphere in terms of fluid mechanics. He identified and characterized both the jet stream and the long waves in the westerlies that were later named Rossby waves.

== Biography ==
Carl-Gustaf Rossby was born in Stockholm, Sweden. He was the first of five children born to Arvid and Alma Charlotta (Marelius) Rossby. He attended Stockholm University, where he developed his first interest in mathematical physics. Rossby came into meteorology and oceanography while studying geophysics under Vilhelm Bjerknes at the Geophysical Institute, University of Bergen in Bergen, Norway, during 1919, where Bjerknes' group was developing the groundbreaking concepts that became known as the Bergen School of Meteorology, including theory of the polar front.

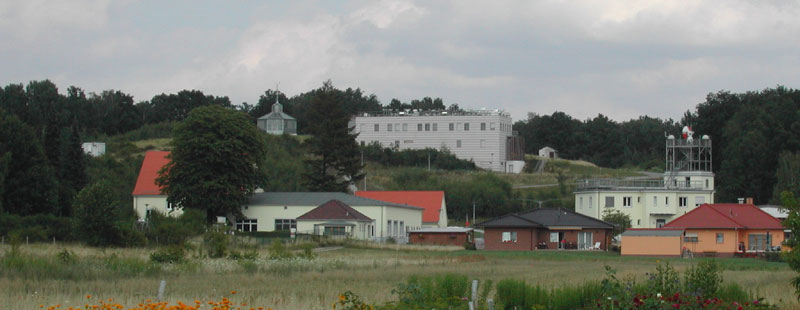
Meteorologisches Observatorium Lindenberg

He also studied at the University of Leipzig and at the Lindenberg Observatory (Meteorologisches Observatorium Lindenberg) in Brandenburg where upper air measurements by kite and balloon were researched. In 1921 he returned to Stockholm to join the Meteorological and Hydrographic Office (which later became the Swedish Meteorological and Hydrological Institute) where he served as a meteorologist on a variety of oceanographic expeditions. While ashore between expeditions, he studied mathematical physics at the Stockholm University (Filosofie Licentiat, 1925).

In 1925 Rossby was granted a fellowship from the Sweden-America Foundation "to study the application of the polar front theory to American weather". In the U.S. Weather Bureau in Washington, DC, he combined theoretical work on atmospheric turbulence with the establishment of the first weather service for civil aviation. In 1928 he became associate professor in the Aeronautics Department of the Massachusetts Institute of Technology (MIT). Shortly after this MIT launched the first department of meteorology in the US. In 1931 he also became a research associate at Woods Hole Oceanographic Institution. His interests during this time ranged over atmospheric thermodynamics, mixing and turbulence, and the interaction between oceans and the atmosphere.

On 9 January 1939 he became an American citizen and in that same year, assistant director of research at the U.S. Weather Bureau. His appointment as chair of the department of meteorology at the University of Chicago in 1940 began the period in which he turned his attention to large-scale atmospheric motions. He identified and characterized both the jet stream and Rossby waves in the atmosphere.

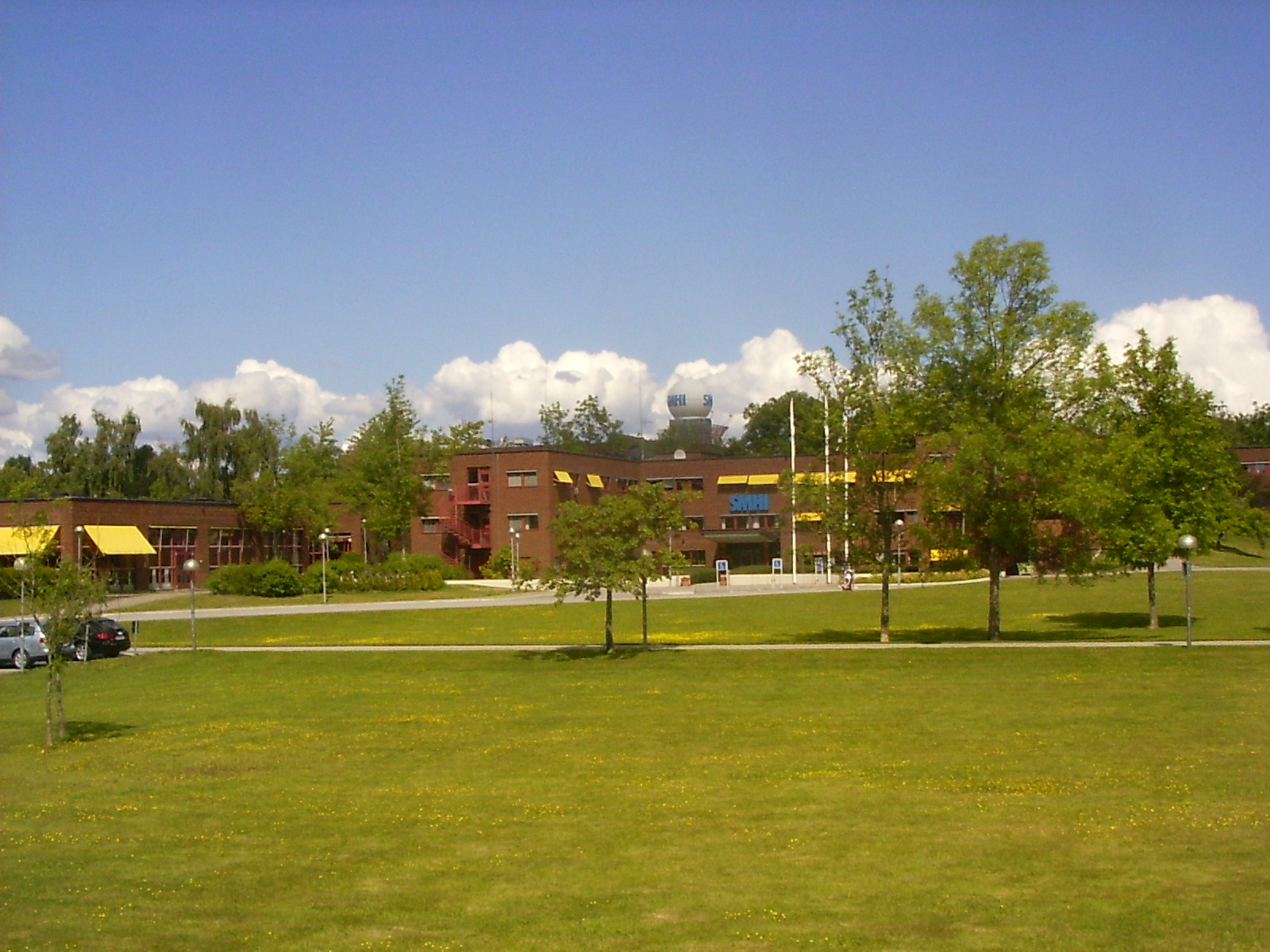
SMHI campus in Norrköping, Sweden

During World War II, Rossby organized the training of military meteorologists, recruiting many of them to his Chicago department in the post-war years where he began adapting his mathematical description of atmospheric dynamics to weather forecasting by electronic computer, having started this activity in Sweden using BESK. In 1947 he became founding director of the Swedish Meteorological and Hydrological Institute (SMHI) in Stockholm, dividing his time between there, the University of Chicago and with the Woods Hole Oceanographic Institution. After the war he visited an old friend Professor Hans Ertel in Berlin. Their cooperation led to the mathematical formulation of Rossby waves.

Between 1954 and his death in Stockholm in 1957, he championed and developed the field of atmospheric chemistry. His contributions to meteorology were noted in the December 17, 1956, issue of Time magazine. His portrait appeared on the cover of that issue, the first meteorologist on the cover of a major magazine. During this period he considered the effect of carbon dioxide in the atmosphere and its potential warming effect.

== Selected works ==
- The layer of frictional influence in wind and ocean currents (Massachusetts Institute of Technology and Woods Hole Oceanographic Institution) – 1935
- Weather estimates from local aerological data: A preliminary report (Institute of Meteorology of the University of Chicago) – 1942
- Kinematic and hydrostatic properties of certain long waves in the westerlies (Institute of Meteorology of the University of Chicago) – 1942

== Honors ==
- Elected member of the American Academy of Arts and Sciences (1934)
- Elected member of the United States National Academy of Sciences (1943)
- Institute of the Aeronautical Sciences (jointly with H. C. Willett) – Sylvanus Albert Reed Award (1934)
- Elected president of the American Meteorological Society (1944–45)
- Elected member of the American Philosophical Society (1946)
- Institute of the Aeronautical Sciences – Robert M. Losey Award (1946)
- Royal Meteorological Society – Symons Gold Medal (1953)
- World Meteorological Organization – International Meteorological Organization Prize (1957)
- American Meteorological Society – Applied Meteorology Award (1959)

== See also ==
- Carl-Gustaf Rossby Research Medal
- Equatorial Rossby wave
- Francis Reichelderfer
- Rossby (crater)
- Rossby-gravity waves
- Rossby number
- Rossby parameter
- Rossby radius of deformation
- Rossby Wave Instability in Astrophysical Discs
- Rossby whistle

== Other sources ==
- Horace R. Byers ─ Carl-Gustaf Arvid Rossby. 1898–1957. A Biographical Memoir (National Academy of Sciences)
- Norman A. Phillips ─ Special Session Honoring the Centennial of the Birth of Carl-Gustaf A. Rossby (American Meteorological Society)
