= Ronald Smith (meteorologist) =

Ronald B. Smith is an emeritus professor of Earth and Planetary Sciences at Yale University. His research includes mesoscale meteorology, regional climate, orographic precipitation, and atmospheric gravity waves.

== Academic biography ==
Smith earned his bachelor's and master's degrees in aerospace engineering from Rensselaer Polytechnic Institute and Princeton University and his PhD in geophysics from Johns Hopkins University. He held the Damon Wells Professorship of Geology and Geophysics at Yale. He retired in 2020 after 44 years on the faculty.

Smith was the founding director of the Yale Center for Earth Observation, which supported research and teaching in remote sensing. He was appointed director in 1993, and Xuhui Lee succeeded him in January 2017.

== Research ==
In 2004, Smith and Idar Barstad developed a linear model of orographic precipitation. The model combines airflow and terrain characteristics with the time needed for precipitation to form and fall, to estimate where it reaches the ground.

Smith was the principal investigator of the Dominica Experiment (DOMEX), a project to measure orographic precipitation in the tropics. The field campaign took place over Dominica in 2011 and included 21 research flights.

He was also one of the principal investigators of the 2014 DEEPWAVE project, which studied gravity waves generated in the troposphere that propagate upwards to the mesosphere near New Zealand.

== Honors ==
He is a Fellow of the American Meteorological Society and won the Society’s Jule G. Charney Award in 2011.
