= Claire Parkinson =

American Earth scientist and climatologist

Claire L. Parkinson
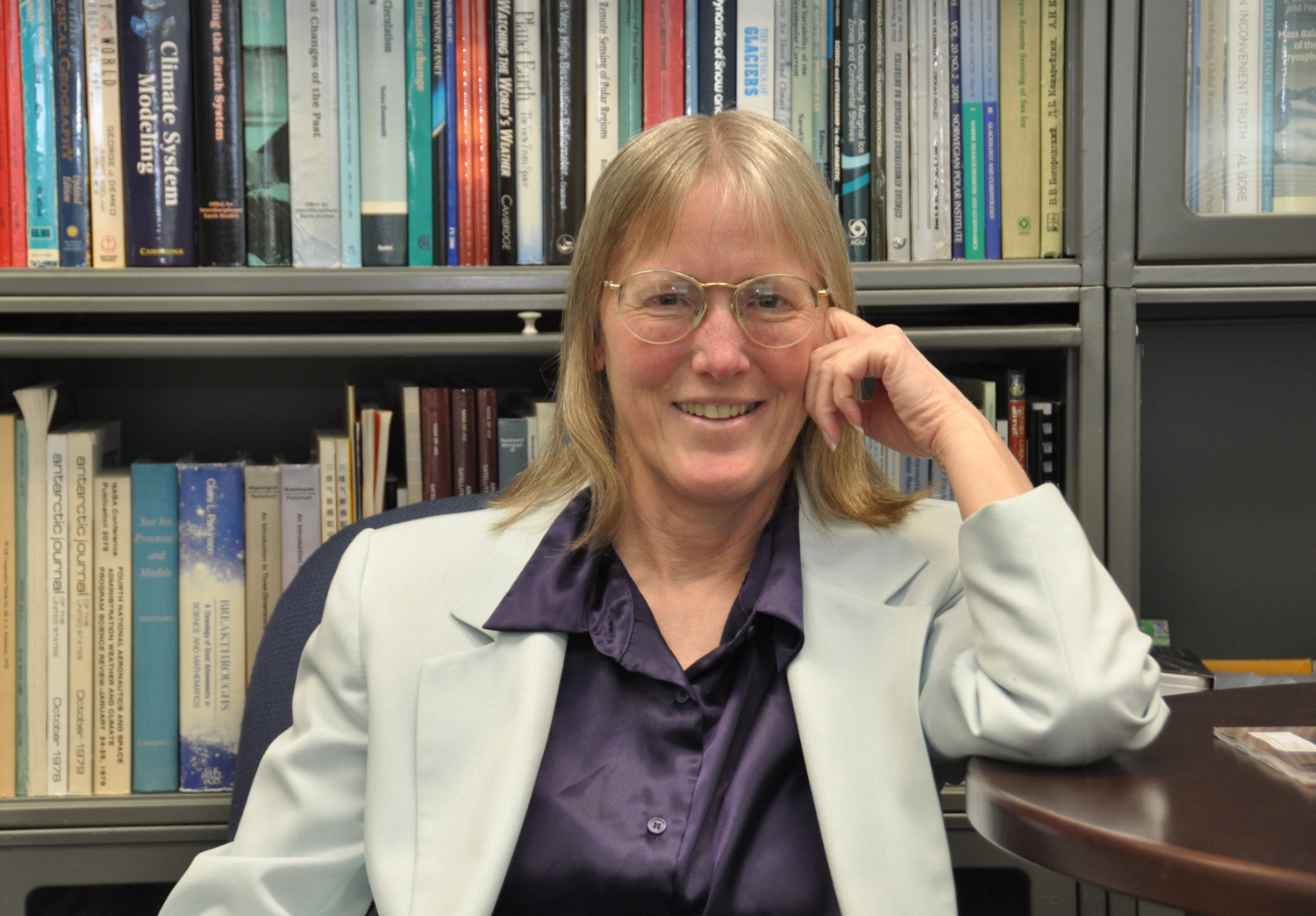
- Credit: NASA/Steve Graham
- Education: Wellesley College; Ohio State University
- Scientific career
- Fields: Earth climate Arctic sea ice
- Workplaces: Ohio State University; National Center for Atmospheric Research; Goddard Space Flight Center

Claire Lucille Parkinson (born March 12, 1948) is an American Earth scientist and climatologist at NASA's Goddard Space Flight Center.

== Education ==
Parkinson has a B.A. in mathematics from Wellesley College, where she was elected to both Phi Beta Kappa and Sigma Xi, and a Ph.D. in geography/climatology from Ohio State University.

== Career ==
Parkinson is a climatologist at NASA's Goddard Space Flight Center, where she works with the Earth Observing System. Parkinson has developed a computer model of sea ice, and she has done field work in both the Arctic and the Antarctic.

Her research emphasis has been on polar sea ice and its connections to the rest of the climate system and to climate change, with a particular emphasis on satellite remote sensing. This work has involved satellite data set generation and analysis, including the determination of decreases in Arctic sea ice coverage since the 1970s and examination of their regional and interannual variabilities and impacts, plus the quantification and analysis of the very different time series of sea ice changes in the Antarctic. Dr. Parkinson is the Project Scientist for the Aqua satellite mission, which launched in May 2002 and continues to transmit data on many atmospheric, ocean, land, and ice variables. The Aqua data have been used in thousands of research publications by scientists worldwide and in numerous practical applications, including weather forecasting and forest fire detection.

== Outreach ==
Parkinson has done considerable outreach to children and the general public, serving as the sole science advisor to the photographic exhibit “Antarctica On Thin Ice” that opened at the United Nations Headquarters in New York City on December 17, 2007. She wrote books about history of science, and is active in promoting women in science.

== Bibliography ==
Parkinson has authored more than 100 scientific publications and author or editor of 15 books, among them she is the lead author of an atlas of Arctic sea ice from satellite data and a coauthor of two other sea ice atlases.

=== Books ===
- Parkinson, Claire L.; Parkinson, C. L. (1985). Breakthroughs: A chronology of great achievements in science and mathematics, 1200 - 1930. Boston: Hall. ISBN 978-0-8161-8706-5.
- Parkinson, Claire L. (1997). Earth from above: using color-coded satellite images to examine the global environment. Sausalito, Calif: University Science Books. ISBN 978-0-935702-41-5.
- Parkinson, Claire; Greenstone, Reynold (October 2000). EOS Data Products Handbook. Vol. 2. CreateSpace Independent Publishing Platform. ISBN 978-1494740429.
- Parkinson, Claire; Washington, Warren (May 16, 2005). Introduction To Three-dimensional Climate Modeling (2nd ed.). University Science Books. ISBN 978-1891389351.
- Parkinson, Claire; Ward, Alan; King, Michael (2006). Earth Science Reference Handbook. NASA.
- Parkinson, Claire; King, Michael; Partington, Kim; Williams, Robin (November 12, 2007). Our Changing Planet: The View from Space (1st ed.). Cambridge University Press. ISBN 978-0521828703.
- Parkinson, Claire (April 16, 2010). Coming Climate Crisis?: Consider the Past, Beware the Big Fix. Rowman & Littlefield Publishers. ISBN 978-0742568303.
- Parkinson, Claire; Millar, Pamela; Thaller, Michelle (2011). Women of Goddard : careers in science, technology, engineering & mathematics. Cambridge University Press.

=== Selected publications ===
- Parkinson, Claire L.; Washington, Warren M. (1979). "A large-scale numerical model of sea ice". Journal of Geophysical Research: Oceans. 84 (C1): 311–337. doi:10.1029/JC084iC01p00311. ISSN 2156-2202.
- Parkinson, Claire L.; Cavalieri, Donald J.; Gloersen, Per; Zwally, H. Jay; Comiso, Josefino C. (1999). "Arctic sea ice extents, areas, and trends, 1978–1996". Journal of Geophysical Research: Oceans. 104 (C9): 20837–20856. doi:10.1029/1999JC900082. ISSN 2156-2202.
- Vaughan, David G.; Marshall, Gareth J.; Connolley, William M.; Parkinson, Claire; Mulvaney, Robert; Hodgson, Dominic A.; King, John C.; Pudsey, Carol J.; Turner, John (2003-10-01). "Recent Rapid Regional Climate Warming on the Antarctic Peninsula". Climatic Change. 60 (3): 243–274. doi:10.1023/A:1026021217991. ISSN 1573-1480.
- Comiso, Josefino C.; Parkinson, Claire L.; Gersten, Robert; Stock, Larry (2008). "Accelerated decline in the Arctic sea ice cover". Geophysical Research Letters. 35 (1). doi:10.1029/2007GL031972. ISSN 1944-8007.
- Cavalieri, D. J.; Parkinson, C. L. (2012-03-09). "Arctic sea ice variability and trends, 1979–2010". doi:10.5194/tcd-6-957-2012.

== Honors and awards ==
- 1969 Election to Phi Beta Kappa, Wellesley College
- 1970 Election to Sigma Xi, Wellesley College
- 1970 Lewis Atterbury Stimson Award in Mathematics, Wellesley College
- 1976 Charles Clifford Huntington Award in Geography, Ohio State University
- 1979 Exceptional Performance Award, NASA Goddard Space Flight Center
- 1982 NASA Group Achievement Award to the authors of Antarctic Sea Ice
- 1984 Peer Award for Best Paper, Laboratory for Atmospheric Sciences, Goddard Space Flight Center
- 2000 Fellow, American Meteorological Society
- 2001 NASA Exceptional Service Medal
- 2003 Aviation Week & Space Technology Laurels Award for Outstanding Achievement in the Field of Space
- 2003 NASA Outstanding Leadership Medal
- 2004 Richard P. Goldthwait Polar Medal
- 2006 American Institute of Aeronautics and Astronautics Space Systems Award
- 2008 NASA Exceptional Achievement Medal
- 2009 Election to the U.S. National Academy of Engineering
- 2010 Election to the American Philosophical Society
- 2010 Fellow, American Association for the Advancement of Science
- 2011 American Meteorological Society Remote Sensing Prize
- 2015 William Nordberg Memorial Award for Earth Science, NASA Goddard Space Flight Center
- 2016 Election to the U.S. National Academy of Sciences
- 2016 Fellow, American Geophysical Union
- 2017 NASA Silver Achievement Medal, FEMA response volunteers
- 2018 Fellow, American Academy of Arts and Sciences
- 2020 Samuel J. Heyman Service to America Medal
- 2020 Maryland Women's Hall of Fame
- 2020 Roger Revelle Medal
