= Bretherton equation =

Nonlinear partial differential equation

In mathematics, the Bretherton equation is a nonlinear partial differential equation introduced by Francis Bretherton in 1964:

$$u_{tt}+u_{xx}+u_{xxxx}+u = u^p,$$

with $p$ integer and $p \ge 2.$ While $u_t, u_x$ and $u_{xx}$ denote partial derivatives of the scalar field $u(x,t).$

The original equation studied by Bretherton has quadratic nonlinearity, $p=2.$ Nayfeh treats the case $p=3$ with two different methods: Whitham's averaged Lagrangian method and the method of multiple scales.

The Bretherton equation is a model equation for studying weakly-nonlinear wave dispersion. It has been used to study the interaction of harmonics by nonlinear resonance. Bretherton obtained analytic solutions in terms of Jacobi elliptic functions.

== Variational formulations ==
The Bretherton equation derives from the Lagrangian density:

$$\mathcal{L} = \tfrac12 \left( u_t \right)^2 + \tfrac12 \left( u_x \right)^2 -\tfrac12 \left( u_{xx} \right)^2
- \tfrac12 u^2 + \tfrac{1}{p+1} u^{p+1}$$

through the Euler–Lagrange equation:

$$\frac{\partial}{\partial t} \left( \frac{\partial\mathcal{L}}{\partial u_t} \right)
+ \frac{\partial}{\partial x} \left( \frac{\partial\mathcal{L}}{\partial u_x} \right)
- \frac{\partial^2}{\partial x^2} \left( \frac{\partial\mathcal{L}}{\partial u_{xx}} \right)
- \frac{\partial\mathcal{L}}{\partial u} = 0.$$

The equation can also be formulated as a Hamiltonian system:

$$\begin{align}
u_t & - \frac{\delta{H}}{\delta v} = 0,
\\
v_t & + \frac{\delta{H}}{\delta u} = 0,
\end{align}$$

in terms of functional derivatives involving the Hamiltonian $H:$

$H(u,v) = \int \mathcal{H}(u,v;x,t)\; \mathrm{d}x$ and $\mathcal{H}(u,v;x,t) = \tfrac12 v^2 - \tfrac12 \left( u_x \right)^2 +\tfrac12 \left( u_{xx} \right)^2 + \tfrac12 u^2 - \tfrac{1}{p+1} u^{p+1}$

with $\mathcal{H}$ the Hamiltonian density – consequently $v=u_t.$ The Hamiltonian $H$ is the total energy of the system, and is conserved over time.
