= Dennis L. Hartmann =

American atmospheric scientist

Dennis L Hartmann is an American atmospheric scientist at the University of Washington. He has done research on ozone depletion and climate change. He is known for his development of the Fixed anvil temperature hypothesis, and other work related to the effect of clouds on Earth's energy balance as well as theories related to the feed back between eddies and zonal jets in the atmosphere.

In 2016 he was elected to the National Academy of Sciences.

He was named Fellow of the American Geophysical Union in 2002, and was awarded the Revelle Medal in 2022. He is also a Fellow of the American Meteorological Society. He was awarded the Carl-Gustaf Rossby Research Medal in 2013.
