= Zdeněk Sekera =

Zdeněk Sekera (3 July 1905 – 1 January 1973) was a Czech scientist who in 1966 won the American Meteorological Society's Carl-Gustaf Rossby Research Medal for atmospheric science for his research into the dynamics of the atmosphere. He was a Guggenheim Fellow in 1956 and 1960 in the fields of astronomy and astrophysics. He was professor of meteorology at the University of California, Los Angeles.
