= Wilfried H. Brutsaert =

Belgian hydrologist

Wilfried Brutsaert is a Belgian hydrologist. He is a member of the U.S. National Academy of Engineering, and won a Horton Medal and Bowie Medal from the American Geophysical Union, and a Charney Award from the American Meteorological Society.
