= Francis Bretherton =

American mathematician, oceanographer and engineer (1935–2021)

Francis Patton Bretherton
- Born: July 6, 1935; Oxford, England
- Died: June 27, 2021 (aged 85); St. Louis, Missouri, U.S.
- Education: B.A., 1st Class Honors, 1958; M.A., 1962; Ph.D. 1961, Cambridge University
- Spouse: Inge Bretherton
- Children: Christopher S. Bretherton; Monica Bretherton; Ruth Okamoto
- Awards: Buchan Prize of the Royal Meteorological Society, 1970; Research Award of the World Meteorological Organization, 1971; Meisinger Award of the American Meteorological Society, 1972
- Scientific career
- Fields: Applied mathematics, meteorology, physical oceanography, biomedical engineering, mechanical engineering, astrophysics & space science
- Workplaces: 1961–1962 Instructor, Dept. of Mechanics, M.I.T.; 1962–1969 DAMTP, Cambridge; 1969–1974 Professor, Dept. of Earth & Planetary Sciences, The Johns Hopkins University; 1972–1974 Chief Scientist, Chesapeake Bay Institute, The Johns Hopkins University; 1973–1980 President, University Corporation for Atmospheric Research (UCAR); 1974–1980 Director, National Center for Atmospheric Research (NCAR); 1980–1988 Senior Scientist, NCAR; 1988–1999 Director, Space Science and Engineering Center, University of Wisconsin, Madison; 2000–2001 Professor, Dept. of Atmospheric and Oceanic Sciences, UW Madison

Francis Patton Bretherton (July 6, 1935 – June 27, 2021) was an English-born American applied mathematician and a professor emeritus of the Department of Atmospheric and Oceanic Sciences at the University of Wisconsin, Madison.

== Background ==
After graduating from Cambridge University, Bretherton worked in the Department of Applied Mathematics and Theoretical Physics (DAMTP) at the University of Cambridge from 1962–1969, progressing from senior assistant in research, to assistant director of research, to university lecturer. In 1964, he introduced the Bretherton equation in applied mathematics. From 1969–1974, he was associated with the Johns Hopkins University, first as a professor in the Department of Earth & Planetary Sciences, and then as chief scientist at the Chesapeake Bay Institute.

Bretherton died in St. Louis, Missouri on June 27, 2021, at the age of 85.

== UCAR and NCAR ==
From 1973 to 1980, Bretherton was president of the University Corporation for Atmospheric Research in Boulder, Colorado. He was also director of the National Center for Atmospheric Research nearly concurrently, from 1974–1980. In 1980, he decided to return to scientific research studies, remaining at NCAR as a senior scientist. During that time he authored over 60 scientific papers.

== SSEC and UW, Madison ==
Bretherton was director of the Space Science and Engineering Center at the graduate school of the University of Wisconsin, Madison from 1988–1999. During that time the center "expanded to add global change studies and management of climate data".

== Awards and honors ==
Bretherton received a number of honors and awards from institutions in both the UK and the US. In 1960 he received the Smiths Prize from the University of Cambridge; in 1960–1962, he was a Research Fellow at Trinity College, Cambridge, and in 1962, he was a Fellow at King's College in Cambridge. In 1970, he was given the Buchan Prize from the Royal Meteorological Society, and in 1971, he received the World Meteorological Organization, Research Award, Area IV. The American Meteorological Society Clarence Leroy Meisinger Award and the American Meteorological Jule G. Charney Award were given to Dr. Bretherton in 1972 and 1982, respectively.
