= Graeme Stephens =

Australian ecologist and professor in California

Graeme Stephens AC FRS
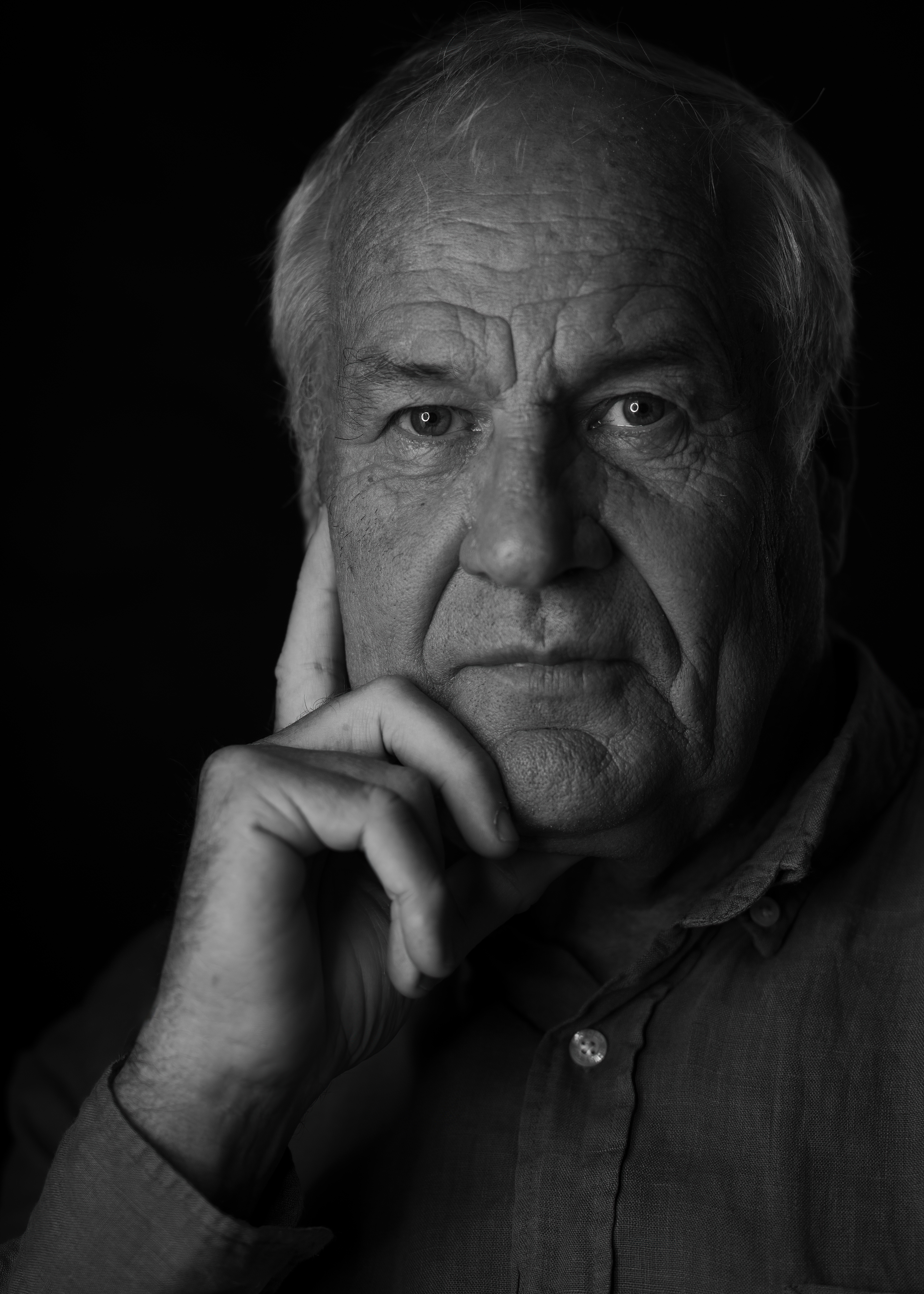
- Graeme Stephens in 2021
- Born: Graeme Leslie Stephens
- Education: University of Melbourne (BS, PhD)
- Known for: CloudSat
- Awards: Jule G. Charney Award (2005)
- Scientific career
- Fields: Atmospheric sciences
- Workplaces: Caltech; Colorado State University; University of Reading; University of Melbourne
- Thesis: The transfer of radiation in cloudy atmospheres (1977)
- Website: science.jpl.nasa.gov/people/Stephens

Graeme Leslie Stephens AC FRS is director of the center for climate sciences at the NASA Jet Propulsion Laboratory at the California Institute of Technology and professor of earth observation the University of Reading.

== Education ==
Stephens was educated at the University of Melbourne in Australia where he received a Bachelor of Science degree in Physics 1973 in followed by a PhD in meteorology in 1977.

== Career and research ==
Stephens research has provided leadership in three major disciplinary areas of Earth sciences:

1. Atmospheric radiation and radiative transfer
2. Earth observations and remote sensing
3. Understanding critical cloud-climate feedbacks and related effects on the Earth's energy budget

Stephens has applied quantitative analysis of global Earth observations alongside theory to study Earth's climate change feedback. He led the design and development of international satellite programmes, including the decade-long CloudSat satellite mission which he created and led, and which has provided data on the vertical structure of clouds and their role in Earth's radiation budget.

=== Awards and honours ===
Stephens was elected a member of the National Academy of Engineering of the United States in 2015, received the Jule G. Charney Award of the American Meteorological Society for pioneering advances in understanding and measuring radiation processes and their role in climate, and received the Gold Medal of the International Radiation Commission in recognition of world leading contributions to the radiation community. He also received National Aeronautics Space Administration, Exceptional Public Service Medal. In 2025 he received the Carl-Gustaf Rossby Research Medal of the American Meteorological Society.

He was elected a Fellow of the Royal Society in 2018. In the 2025 King's Birthday Honours, Stephens was appointed a Companion of the Order of Australia for "eminent service to atmospheric and meteorological science, particularly cloud physics, to climate change research, and as a mentor".
