= Hans Ertel =

Hans Ertel (24 March 1904 in Berlin – 2 July 1971 in Berlin) was a German natural scientist and a pioneer in geophysics, meteorology and hydrodynamics.

== Life and work ==
Hans Ertel began his scientific career at the former Preußischen Meteorologischen Institut (Prussian Meteorological Institute), where the representatives of the Austrian school of meteorology, (Heinrich von Ficker and Albert Defant) had formative influence on him and gave him their lasting support. Ertel continued the works of Felix Maria von Exner-Ewarten, a leading theoretical meteorologist of his time who lived in Vienna, and he completed many of them. He developed into a capable theoretical physicist early on, and he was already to publish research results or theoretical approaches in this subject as a young man. Ertel's famous vorticity equation of 1942 belongs today to the basic work of modern geophysics and astrophysics.

In 1943, he was given the position of professor for meteorology and geophysics at the University of Innsbruck, and he also attended lectures by Arnold Sommerfeld. After Second World War, Ertel was interested in a professorship for geophysics at the Ludwig-Maximilians-Universität München, but was instead appointed to professor for geophysics at the Friedrich Wilhelm University of Berlin in 1946, where he also became the director of the Institute for Meteorology and Geophysics which belonged to the university.

At the invitation of various scientists, such as Hilding Köhler, Markus Bath and Carl-Gustav Rossby, with whom he also maintained long friendships, Ertel held lectures at Stockholm University and Uppsala University in Sweden and took part in congresses, thereby creating a good reputation for his field of research at the Friedrich Wilhelm University of Berlin.

As a member of the Deutschen Akademie der Wisschaften zu Berlin, (German Academy of Sciences Berlin), or DAW, Ertel founded and led the Institute for Physical Hydrography of this academy as of 1948. In 1949, Ertel was elected to be a full member of the DAW and was its vice president from 1951 to 1961. During this time, he saw to the founding of some new academy institutes, and also ensured that all of Germany could participate during the International Geophysical Years (1957/58 and 1958/59).

The research on geo-ecology, which began under his leadership at the institute, is considered to be pioneering work today. The following areas of emphasis in research from his time as leader of the Institute enriched scientific knowledge and the subject areas to a great degree:

- physical hydrography (more than 60 works)
- theoretical hydrodynamics
- turbulence
- special hydrodynamics of the northern German seas and coasts
- hydraulic nomography
- hydrographic cartography
- the history of European weather
- theoretical mechanics (as of 1960)

The results of his work were regularly published in specialized international and national magazines (e.g., the Monthly Reports of the German Academy of Sciences), as well as in the magazine of the institute, Acta Hydrophysica, and soon led to a high reputation for himself and for his institute.

Even beyond his institute, Ertel made sure that the magazines, Gerlands Beiträge zur Geophysik, Zeitschrift für Meteorologie and Forschungen und Fortschritte appeared and he collaborated on the Deutschen Literaturzeitschrift himself. Furthermore, he held guest lectures abroad, especially at conferences, participated in research trips and supported international projects.

Personally, Ertel was concerned with coastal protection, theoretical geomorphology, meteorological problems and cosmology.

== Selected publications ==
The following publications are in the Academy Library of the Berlin-Brandenburg Academy of Sciences:

- Oceanography and Hydrography (Hans Ertel) – Bremen (among others): AKGGP/SHGCP, Science Ed., 2006
- Geophysical Hydrodynamics and Ertel's Potential Vorticity (Hans Ertel) – Bremen: Rönnebeck, 1991
- Eine Beziehung zwischen dem Wirbel, der Wirbelbeschleunigung und dem Beschleunigungspotential in Strömungsfeldern perfekter, inkompressibler Flüssigkeiten: essay by Hans Ertel
- Stationäre Triftströme im Ozean bei inhomogener Tangentialspannung des Windes: essay by Hans Ertel
- Kinematik und Dynamik formbeständig wandernder Transversaldünen: essay by Hans Ertel
- Litorale Abrasion und küstenparalleler Sinkstoff-Transport: essay by Hans Ertel
- Die Nullfläche der Tangentialspannung in Seen bei stationärem Windstau: essay by Hans Ertel
- Theorie und Verteilung des Salzgehalts an der Meeresoberfläche als Funktion der Verdunstung und des Niederschlags: essay by Hans Ertel
- Eine Beziehung zwischen den Nullflächen der Geschwindigkeit und der Tangentialspannung in Seen bei stationärem Windstau: essay by Hans Ertel

Between 1991 and 2006, Wilfried Schröder published Collected Works of Hans Ertel, seven volumes in all, Science Edition, Bremen.

A commemorative work appeared on the 100th anniversary of his birth with the title, "Meteorological and Geophysical Fluid Dynamics", published by Wilfried Schröder, with contributions by internationally renowned scientists, Science Edition, Bremen.

His geophysical works on hydrodynamics appeared as Ertel Collected Works "Geophysical Fluid Dynamics", published by Wilfried Schröder, Science Edition, Bremen, 2004.

Commemorative articles on Hans Ertel by Wilfried Schröder appeared in EOS (2004), WMO Bulletin (2004), as well as in a review in Idöjaras (Budapest, 2004).

A biography of Hans Ertel by Wilfried Schröder was published in the magazine of the Royal Meteorological Society, "Weather", in 1999.

An article on the life and work of Hans Ertel, also by Wilfried Schröder, is also contained in "Dictionary of Scientific Biographies".
