= Bernhard Haurwitz =

Bernhard Haurwitz (August 14, 1905 in Glogau, Germany – February 27, 1986 in Fort Collins, Colorado) was a German-born American meteorologist and physicist. Haurwitz was Chair of Department of Meteorology at New York University (NYU), a member of the National Academy of Sciences (NAS), and a recipient of the Carl-Gustaf Rossby Research Medal. He was awarded the William Bowie Medal in 1970.

== Education ==
Haurwitz received a Ph.D. degree in Meteorology and Geophysics in 1927 from the University of Leipzig.
