= Christopher S. Bretherton =

American atmospheric scientist

- Education: Massachusetts Institute of Technology (PhD)
- Spouse: Alison C. Cullen
- Awards: Jule G. Charney Award (2012), Fellow of American Meteorological Society and American Geophysical Union
- Scientific career
- Fields: Atmospheric sciences, climate modeling, applied mathematics
- Workplaces: University of Washington, Vulcan Inc., Allen Institute for AI

Christopher Stephen Bretherton is an American atmospheric scientist and Emeritus Professor of Atmospheric Sciences and Applied Mathematics at the University of Washington (UW). He is also the senior director of climate modeling at the Allen Institute for Artificial Intelligence.

== Early life and education ==
Bretherton earned his PhD in Mathematics at Massachusetts Institute of Technology (MIT) in 1984 and his postdoctorate at the National Center for Atmospheric Research in 1985 He is the son of mathematician Francis Bretherton and psychologist Inge Bretherton.

== Academic career ==
Bretherton joined the University of Washington after his postdoctorate in 1985 at the Department of Applied Mathematics. In 1988, he was appointed jointly at the Department of Atmospheric Sciences.

He became Senior Director of Climate Modeling for Vulcan Inc. in 1999 and then moved to Allen Institute for Artificial Intelligence with the same role.

== Awards and honors ==
Bretherton received the Jule G. Charney Award in 2012, earned The Bernhard Haurwitz Memorial Lecturer in 2019,, and is a Fellow of the American Meteorological Society and the American Geophysical Union.

== Personal life ==
Bretherton is married to Alison Cullen, a professor at UW’s Evans School of Public Policy and Governance.
