= Pieter Tans =

Pieter P. Tans is an American physicist and climate change researcher. He is a fellow of the American Geophysical Union and the American Association for the Advancement of Science. He worked at NOAA's Carbon Cycle Greenhouse Gases group from 1985 to 2019 and received a Roger Revelle Medal in 2010.
