= Kuo-Nan Liou =

Taiwanese American meteorologist (1943–2021)

- 廖國男
- Born: November 16, 1943; Taiwan
- Died: March 20, 2021 (aged 76); Los Angeles, California, U.S.
- Citizenship: American
- Education: National Taiwan University (BS); New York University (PhD)
- Scientific career
- Fields: Meteorology
- Workplaces: University of California, Los Angeles
- Thesis: Calculations of Multiple Backscattered Radiation and Depolarization from Water Clouds for a Collimated Pulsed Lidar System (1970)

Kuo-Nan Liou (simplified Chinese: 廖国男; traditional Chinese: 廖國男; pinyin: Liào Guónán; 16 November 1943 – 20 March 2021) was a Taiwanese meteorologist.

== Biography ==
Liou was born in Taiwan on November 16, 1943. After graduating from National Taiwan University in 1965, he pursued advanced studies in the United States, earning his Ph.D. in physics from New York University in 1970. He did post-doctoral research at National Aeronautics and Space Administration (NASA). He was a professor at University of Utah since 1975. He joined the faculty of University of California, Los Angeles in 1997 and was promoted to director of Department of Atmospheric and Marine Sciences in 2000. He was elected a fellow of the National Academy of Engineering (NAE)in 1999 and a fellow of the Academia Sinica in 2004. In 2006 he was appointed the first dean of the newly founded Joint Institute for Regional Earth System Science and Engineering. He was elected a foreign member of the Chinese Academy of Sciences on November 28, 2017.

== Awards ==
- 1998 Jule G. Charney Award, for his pioneering work in the theory and application of radiative transport and its interaction with clouds.
- 2010 William Nordberg Medal
- 2013 Roger Revelle Medal
- 2018 Carl-Gustaf Rossby Research Medal
