= Kaiyu Guan =

Chinese and American environmental scientist (born 1985)

- 管开宇
- Education: Nanjing University (BS); Princeton University (MA, PhD)
- Awards: MacArthur Fellowship (2026); James B. Macelwane Medal (2023)
- Scientific career
- Fields: Environmental science; Remote sensing; Agroecosystem modeling
- Workplaces: University of Illinois Urbana-Champaign; Stanford University; The Climate Corporation
- Doctoral advisor: Eric Franklin Wood
- Website: kaiyuguan.nres.illinois.edu

Kaiyu Guan (管开宇; born c. 1985) is a Chinese and American environmental scientist who studies the interaction between crops, climate, and farming practices. He is the Stuart L. and Nancy J. Levenick Professor at the University of Illinois Urbana-Champaign (UIUC). His research group combines satellite and field observations, process-based models, and machine learning to monitor and predict crop productivity and environmental outcomes across agricultural landscapes. He founded and directs UIUC's Agroecosystem Sustainability Center, serves as chief scientist of the NASA Acres consortium, and is the founder of the agricultural technology company HabiTerre.

Guan was awarded the James B. Macelwane Medal in 2023 by the American Geophysical Union and named a MacArthur Fellow in 2026, at the age of 41.

== Early life and education ==
Guan's given name, written 开宇 in Chinese characters, was chosen by his grandfather, who hoped the boy would grow up to become an astronaut.

He studied geography and geoinformatics at Nanjing University, graduating with a bachelor's degree in 2008. He then enrolled at Princeton University, where he earned a master's degree in 2010 and a doctorate in 2013, working under the hydrologist Eric Franklin Wood. (Note: Princeton describes the doctorate as being in civil and environmental engineering, while Guan's own faculty page lists it as environmental engineering.) In 2012 he held a NASA Earth and Space Science Fellowship.

Guan has credited Wood with changing the direction of his life, saying that Wood insisted on rigor, urged him to pose his own questions, and gave him room to chart an independent scientific path. When he accepted the Macelwane Medal in 2023, he dedicated it to Wood.

== Career ==
After completing his doctorate, Guan spent two years, from 2013 to 2015, as a postdoctoral scholar in Earth system science at Stanford University, supervised by David Lobell and Joseph Berry. He then worked for a year as a quantitative researcher at The Climate Corporation.

Guan joined UIUC in 2016 as an assistant professor of natural resources and environmental sciences, and became a Blue Waters Professor in supercomputing at the National Center for Supercomputing Applications. The same year he received a NASA New Investigator Award. He was promoted to associate professor in 2021 and to full professor in 2024, and in 2025 he was appointed to the Levenick endowed professorship. In 2021 he became the founding director of the Agroecosystem Sustainability Center, an interdisciplinary unit at the university. His group joined the NASA Harvest program in 2019.

Guan later became chief scientist of NASA Acres, a consortium of dozens of partners that applies the agency's Earth observation technology to farming questions.

=== Research ===
Much of Guan's early work at Illinois addressed the problem of obtaining dependable satellite imagery at the scale of individual fields. In 2018, with Yunan Luo and Jian Peng, he published STAIR, an automated method that blends MODIS and Landsat surface reflectance data into a daily, 30-meter record free of cloud and gap artifacts. The authors demonstrated it on Champaign County, Illinois, producing growing-season time series for every year from 2000 to 2015. A 2020 successor, STAIR 2.0, added Sentinel-2 imagery to reach a resolution of 10 meters. A U.S. patent covering the fusion approach, naming Guan, Peng, and Luo as inventors, was issued in 2026.

Guan also worked on crop yield forecasting. A 2018 study in Geophysical Research Letters by Bin Peng, Guan, Ming Pan, and Yan Li found that a maize forecast built from seasonal climate predictions plus satellite measurements of crop condition beat the survey-based forecast in the U.S. Department of Agriculture's World Agricultural Supply and Demand Estimates reports, whereas a model using climate predictions alone could not. For August, the system's average error over the evaluation period was 4.37 bushels per acre, against 5.63 for the USDA estimate.

Guan's group later broadened its focus to agricultural carbon and nitrogen. The MacArthur Foundation notes that the group built methods linking field, airborne, and satellite measurements, which allowed them to map crop nitrogen status and photosynthetic activity from single fields up to whole regions. In 2020, ARPA-E funded a $4.5 million project led by Guan to develop tools for generating carbon credits on farmland. Working with collaborators, Guan also helped develop a knowledge-guided machine learning (KGML) framework, in which process models help steer the learning algorithm, to estimate greenhouse gas emissions, crop yields, and soil carbon at the field level. He has since combined KGML, other AI tools, observational data, and process models into what the foundation calls a "system-of-systems" framework for predictive agricultural science, intended to let farmers and policymakers estimate unobservable conditions and test how outcomes respond to weather or management changes.

=== HabiTerre ===
HabiTerre was spun out of UIUC in 2019, with Guan as its founder. The company's software combines remote sensing, process models, and artificial intelligence to estimate greenhouse gas emissions and soil carbon outcomes of agricultural practices. HabiTerre completed a first close of a $10 million Series A round led by Deere & Company, and its model was validated by the nonprofit Climate Action Reserve.

== Awards and honors ==
The John D. and Catherine T. MacArthur Foundation announced its 2026 class of 20 fellows on September 29, 2026; each fellow receives $800,000 over five years. The foundation cited Guan for supplying the scientific and technical grounding for agriculture that is both more productive and more environmentally sustainable under climate change and population growth. Guan said his long-term goal is "to monitor, model and help optimize every farm field on the planet."

Other honors include:

- 2016: NASA New Investigator Award
- 2018: Global Environmental Change Early Career Award, American Geophysical Union
- 2019: CAREER Award, National Science Foundation
- 2022: Groundbreaker Prize, FoodShot Global
- 2023: James B. Macelwane Medal
- 2023: Fellow of the American Geophysical Union
- 2021 and 2024: Finalist, Blavatnik National Awards for Young Scientists (Note: The Blavatnik Awards website also carries a profile of Guan as a 2025 national finalist.)
- 2025: National winner, agInnovation Research Innovation Award of Excellence
