= Jorge L. Sarmiento =

American geophysicist

Jorge L. Sarmiento (died 2026) was an American geophysicist who founded the Carbon and Climate Observations and Modeling. He won the 2009 Roger Revelle Medal from the AGU.

In 2004, Sarmiento was named a fellow of the American Association for the Advancement of Science.
