= José Pinto Peixoto =

Portuguese meteorologist

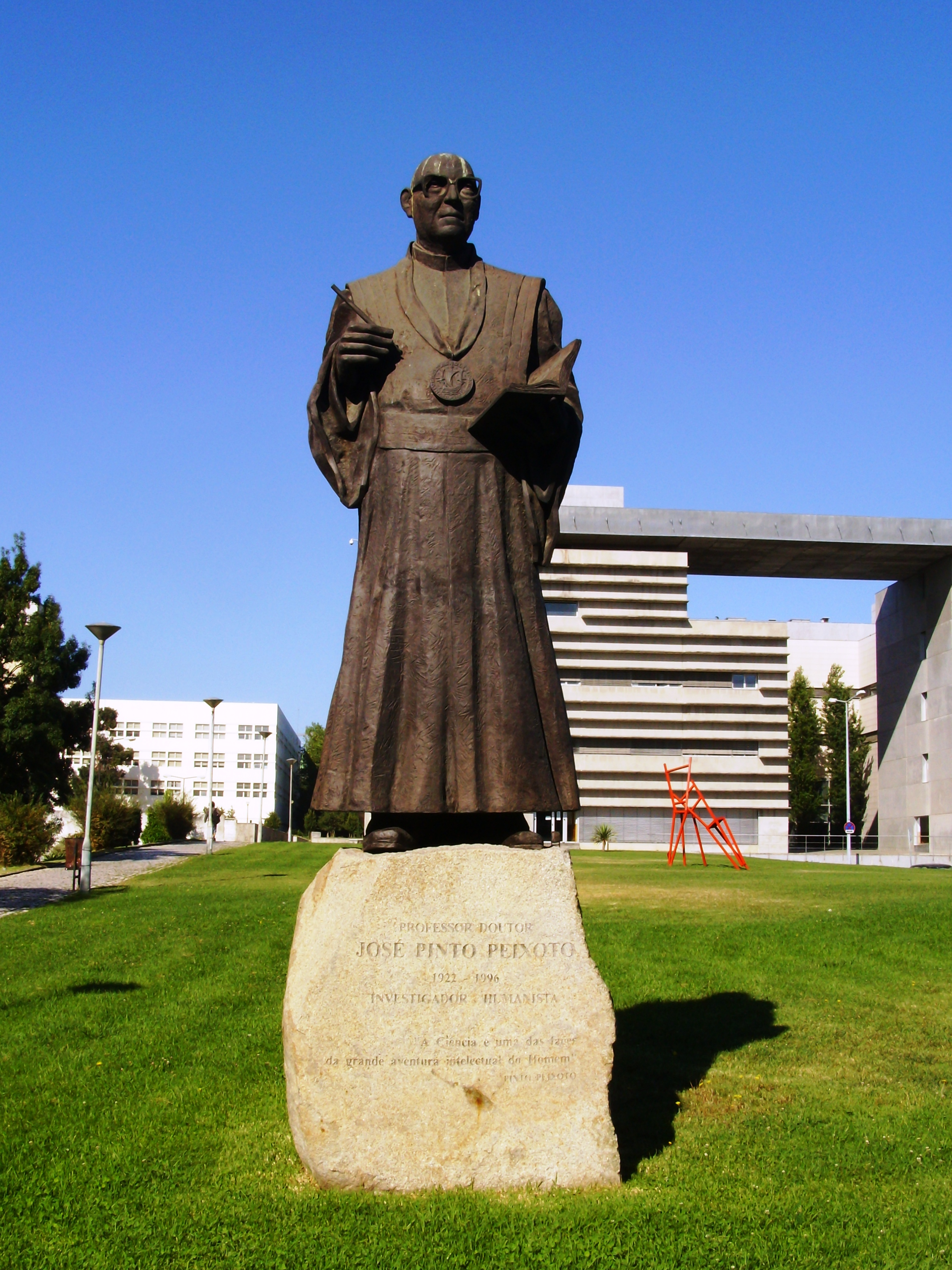
- A statue of Pinto Peixoto at the Faculty of Sciences of the University of Lisbon
- Born: 9 November 1922; Miuzela, Almeida, Portugal
- Died: 6 December 1996 (aged 74); Lisbon, Portugal
- Education: University of Lisbon (MS, PhD)
- Scientific career
- Fields: Meteorology
- Workplaces: University of Lisbon, Massachusetts Institute of Technology
- Doctoral advisor: Victor Starr

José Pinto Peixoto (November 9, 1922 – December 6, 1996) was a Portuguese meteorologist. As a part of Victor Starr's research group, including Abraham H. Oort and Ed Lorenz, and then later as director of the Geophysical Institute de Luis at the University of Lisbon, he contributed to theories of the global atmospheric circulation.

Peixoto is best known for his textbook, Physics of Climate, written in conjunction with Oort.

Career Honors

- Professor of Physics, Thermodynamics, and Theoretical Meteorology at the University of Lisbon
- Director of the Geophysical Institute de Luis
- President of the National Academy of Sciences of Lisbon
- Executive Committee Member of the European Science Foundation
