= Clara Deser =

American climatologist

- Scientific career
- Workplaces: National Center for Atmospheric Research
- Doctoral advisor: John Michael Wallace

Clara Deser is an American climate scientist. She is a senior scientist at the National Center for Atmospheric Research where she leads the Climate Analysis Section. Deser was elected to the United States National Academy of Sciences in 2021.

== Early and personal life ==
Clara Deser was born to Polish-American theoretical physicist Stanley Deser and Swedish artist Elsbeth Deser. As a child, she loved mathematics and map making. She earned a B.S. in Earth and Planetary Sciences from MIT in 1982, and a Ph.D. in Atmospheric Sciences from the University of Washington in 1989 under the supervision of John Michael Wallace, with her dissertation entitled "Meteorological Characteristics of the El Nino--Southern Oscillation Phenomenon". She was a postdoctoral fellow with Maurice Blackmon at the Cooperative Institute for Environmental Sciences at the University of Colorado, and joined the National Center for Atmospheric Research in 1997.

== Research ==
In 2016 Clara Deser had partnered with Benjamin Sanderson and used two existing sets of model simulations to investigate what future summers might look like. By using these models, they predicted that the summers from 2061 to 2080 will be the hottest on record if the carbon emissions continue to rise.

In 2018 she praised James Hansen's prediction on global temperature forecast calling it "incredible" and "astounding".Hansen accurately predicted the global temperature forecast of summer, 2018 back in 1988.

== Honors. ==
- 2017: Bjerknes Lecture, American Geophysical Union
- 2021: Member of the U. S. National Academy of Sciences.
- 2021: recipient of the Roger Revelle Medal of the American Geophysical Union
