= Steven Wofsy =

Steven Charles Wofsy is an American atmospheric and hydrospheric scientist, currently Abbott Lawrence Rotch Professor of Atmospheric and Environmental Science at Harvard University and an Elected Fellow of the American Association for the Advancement of Science. He was elected to the National Academy of Sciences in 2011 and was awarded the Roger Revelle Medal in 2012.

Wofsy is one of the foremost global experts in measuring atmospheric gas concentrations, including greenhouse gas concentrations, with spaceborne sensors. Along with Environmental Defense Fund chief scientist Steven Hamburg, he was a co-initiator of the MethaneSAT initiative.
