= David Battisti =

American atmospheric scientist

David Battisti (born 1956) is The Tamaki Endowed Chair of Atmospheric Sciences of the University of Washington and a fellow at the American Geophysical Union. His research interests include understanding how interactions between the ocean, land, atmosphere, and sea ice lead to climatic variability at timescales that vary from seasonal to decadal timescales, as well as the paleoclimate. He is also interested in how climate variability (including El Nino) affects food production.

He received his PhD in 1988 at the University of Washington Department of Atmospheric Sciences. He has published over 100 papers in peer-reviewed journals in atmospheric sciences and oceanography.

He also helps organize an annual set of climate dynamics courses.

Battisti won the Carl-Gustaf Rossby Research Medal from the American Meteorological Society in 2021, for his "contributions to understanding climate variability for phenomena ranging from the El Niño/Southern Oscillation and the Pacific Decadal Oscillation to paleoclimate."
