= Alan Robock =

American climatologist

Alan Robock: FAAAS; FAGU; FAMS
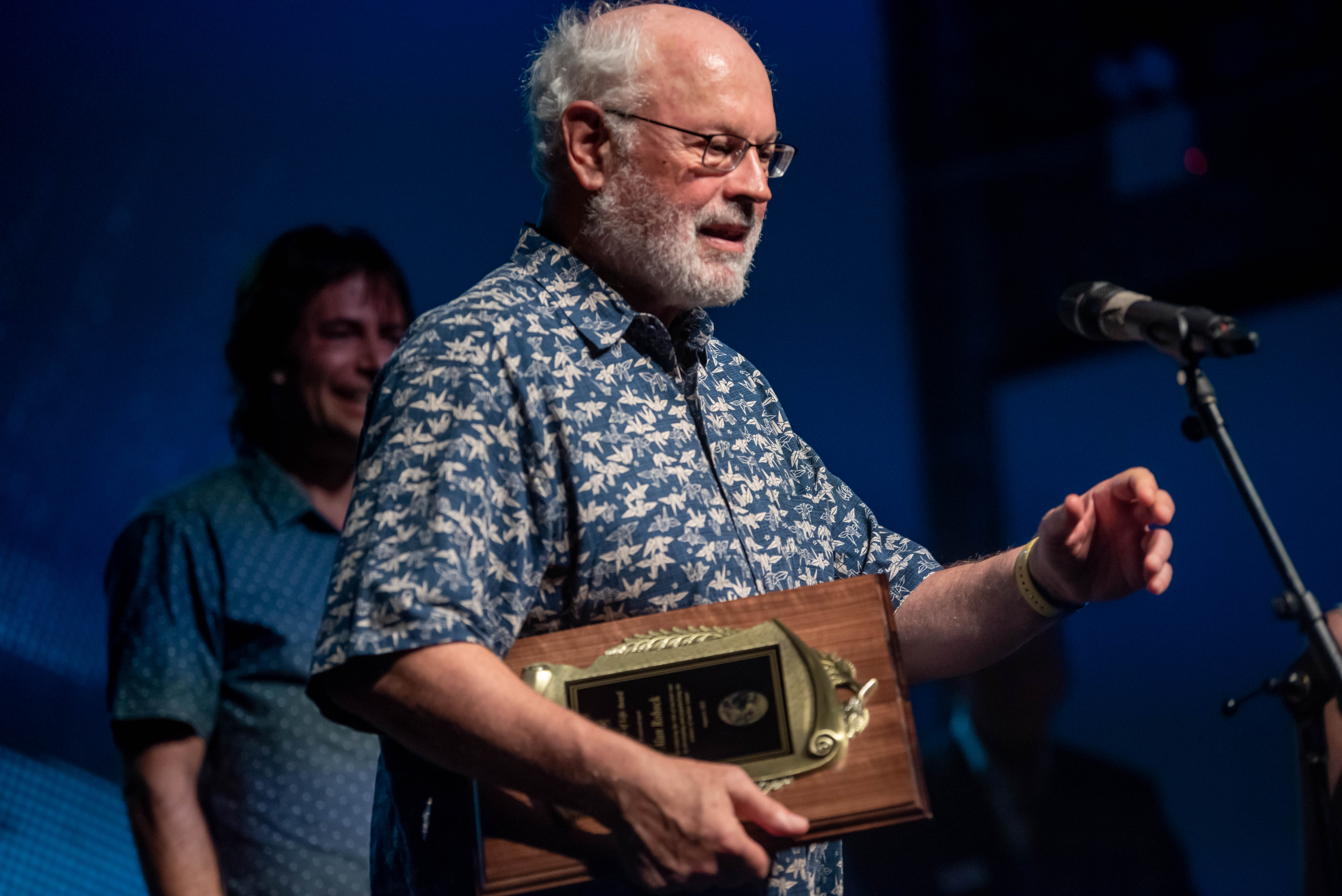
- Born: 1949 (age 76–77)
- Education: University of Wisconsin; Massachusetts Institute of Technology
- Awards: Jule G. Charney Award
- Scientific career
- Fields: climatology
- Workplaces: Rutgers University
- Website: https://people.envsci.rutgers.edu/robock/

Alan Robock (born 1949) is an American climatologist. He is currently a Distinguished Professor in the Department of Environmental Sciences at Rutgers University, New Jersey. He advocates nuclear disarmament and, in 2010 and 2011, met with Fidel Castro during lecture trips to Cuba to discuss the dangers of nuclear weapons. Alan Robock was a 2007 IPCC author, a member of the organisation when it was awarded the Nobel Peace Prize, "for their efforts to build up and disseminate greater knowledge about man-made climate change, and to lay the foundations for the measures that are needed to counteract such change".

== Life and work ==
Robock has a B.A. from the University of Wisconsin (1970), a S.M. from the Massachusetts Institute of Technology (1974) and a Ph.D. from Massachusetts Institute of Technology (1977) in Meteorology under advisor Edward Norton Lorenz.

In 2011, he and Hans Joachim Schellnhuber, among others, were part of the Pontifical Academy of Sciences panel, to discuss and advise the Vatican on climate engineering. Robock was a lead author in Working Group I for the 2013 published Fifth Assessment Report of the Intergovernmental Panel on Climate Change (Chapter 8). In 2017, Robock published an open letter in the Huffington Post, addressed at Donald Trump, warning him about nuclear weapons, and nuclear winter. In 2022, Robock, along with seven other recipients, was presented with the Future of Life Award. The honor was bestowed for Robock's efforts to reduce the risk of nuclear war by developing and popularizing the science of nuclear winter.

== Research ==
Robock has researched nuclear winter, the Toba catastrophe theory, the Little Ice Age, the effect of volcanic eruptions on climate, soil moisture, human impacts of climate change, regional atmosphere-hydrology modeling, and geoengineering. In 2022, an analysis led by Lili Xia and Alan Robock of Rutgers University quantified the effects of nuclear war on global food production in the journal Nature Food. The study estimates that with their current number of warheads, a nuclear war between the US and Russia could generate 150 million tons of soot, thanks to massive fires ignited by explosions. The soot would quickly cover the globe and block incoming sunlight, creating the equivalent of a shade and causing drastic global cooling. Crops and livestock would wither and die in the cold and dark. The research concludes that nuclear winter could result in an estimated 5 billion deaths from famine if global calorie production drops by 90 percent.

== Honors ==
- Fellow of the American Meteorological Society, 1998.
- Participant in the Intergovernmental Panel on Climate Change, which was awarded a Nobel Peace Prize, 2007.
- American Meteorological Society Sigma Xi Distinguished Lecturer, 2008-2009.
- Fellow of the American Association for the Advancement of Science, 2008.
- Fellow of the American Geophysical Union, 2011.
- Jule G. Charney Award of the American Meteorological Society, 2015, "For fundamental contributions toward understanding the climatic effects of stratospheric aerosols from volcanoes and other potential sources, and the role of soil moisture in climate."
- 2022 Future of Life Award (Nuclear Winter)
