= Dennis P. Lettenmaier =

American hydrologist

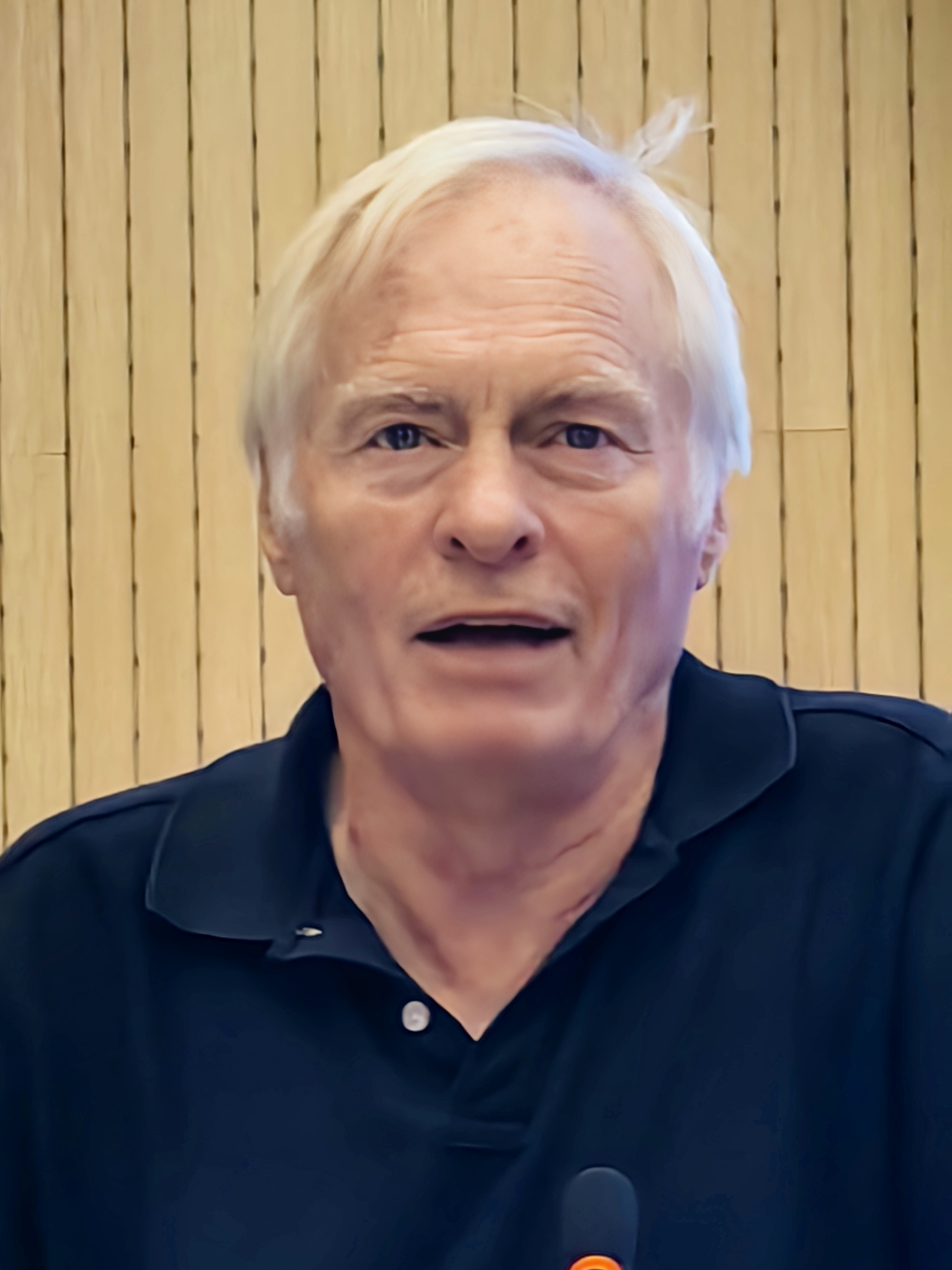
Dennis P. Lettenmaier (2024)

Dennis P. Lettenmaier is an American hydrologist.

Lettenmaier earned a bachelor's degree in mechanical engineering from the University of Washington in 1970, then attended George Washington University, where he pursued a master's degree in civil, mechanical and environmental engineering. He returned to UW to complete a doctorate in civil engineering in 1975, and accepted a faculty position at his alma mater in 1976. Lettenmaier joined the University of California, Los Angeles faculty in 2014, and was appointed to a distinguished professorship.

In 1990, Lettenmaier was a joint awardee of the Walter L. Huber Civil Engineering Research Prize. The American Geophysical Union granted Lettenmaier fellowship in 1995, its Hydrology Section Award in 2000, and its 2018 Robert E. Horton Medal. The American Meteorological Society elected Lettenmaier to fellow status in 1998. He was the founding chief editor of the AMS-published Journal of Hydrometeorology from 2000 through 2003. Lettenmaier was the 2018 recipient of the Jule G. Charney Award bestowed by the AMS. He was elected a fellow of the American Association for the Advancement of Science in 2007, followed by membership of the National Academy of Engineering in 2010, "[f]or contributions to hydrologic modeling for stream water quality and hydro-climate trends and models for improved water management."
