= Eric Franklin Wood =

Canadian-American hydrologist (1947–2021)

Eric Franklin Wood (1947 – 3 November 2021) was a Canadian-American hydrologist.

Wood was born in Vancouver, British Columbia in 1947. He earned a bachelor's degree in civil engineering at the University of British Columbia in 1970, and completed a doctor of science degree in the subject at the Massachusetts Institute of Technology in 1974. He joined the Princeton University faculty in 1976, was later named Susan Dod Brown Professor of Civil and Environmental Engineering, and retired in 2019 with emeritus status.

He was a fellow and 2010 awardee of the American Meteorological Society's Jule G. Charney Award. The Australian Academy of Technological Sciences and Engineering also granted Wood fellowship in 2010. Wood was selected a fellow of the Royal Society of Canada in 2013, received the European Geosciences Union's Alfred Wegener Medal in 2014, elected a member of the National Academy of Engineering in 2015, "[f]or development of land surface models and use of remote sensing for hydrologic modeling and prediction," and elected a fellow of the American Association for the Advancement of Science in 2017. The American Geophysical Union awarded fellowship, and in 2017, the Robert E. Horton Medal to Wood.

Notable past students include Kaiyu Guan.

Wood died of cancer on 3 November 2021.
