= William M. Gray =

American meteorologist (1929–2016)

- Born: William Mason Gray; 9 October 1929; Detroit, Michigan
- Died: 16 April 2016 (aged 86); Fort Collins, Colorado
- Education: University of Chicago
- Known for: Research into hurricanes, climate change skepticism
- Spouse: Nancy Price (m. 1954; died 2001)
- Children: 4
- Scientific career
- Fields: Atmospheric science
- Workplaces: Colorado State University
- Thesis: On the Scales of Motion and Internal Stress Characteristics of the Hurricane (1964)

William Mason Gray was an American meteorologist who was emeritus professor of atmospheric science at Colorado State University (CSU), and the head of the Tropical Meteorology Project at CSU's Department of Atmospheric Sciences. He is widely regarded as a pioneer in the science of tropical cyclone forecasting and one of the world's leading experts on tropical storms. After retiring as a faculty member at CSU in 2005, Gray remained actively involved in both climate change and tropical cyclone research until his death.

== Early life and career ==
Gray was born on 9 October 1929, in Detroit, Michigan, and was the eldest son of Ulysses S. Gray and Beatrice Mason Gray. His family moved to Washington, D.C. in 1939 where he graduated from Wilson High School. In 1952, Gray received a B.S. degree in geography from George Washington University before joining the United States Air Force in 1953. Over the next four years, he served as an overseas weather forecast officer, primarily stationed in the Azores and England. Upon returning to the United States in 1957, he began work as a research assistant at the University of Chicago Department of Meteorology from 1957 to 1961. During his time there, he earned a M.S. in meteorology 1959 and went on to earn a PhD in geophysical sciences in 1964 under the mentorship of Herbert Riehl.

He joined Colorado State University (CSU) in 1961 as part of the Department of Atmospheric Science. Gray remained active in the Air Force Reserves until 1974, at which time he retired as a Lieutenant colonel. Following his retirement from the Reserves, he became a professor at CSU and went on to advise successful 20 PhD and 50 M.S. graduates. Eight of his students received awards from the American Meteorological Society while under his mentorship. Many of his students went on to become prominent members of the meteorological community, with several working at the National Hurricane Center. His last student was Philip Klotzbach, who later took over Gray's position as lead author of the CSU seasonal hurricane forecasts.

Gray worked closely with the World Meteorological Organization throughout his career. Starting in 1978, he traveled to numerous countries establish or improve connections with meteorologists across the globe, a groundbreaking action. In 1985, he organized the first International Workshop on Tropical Cyclones in Bangkok, Thailand.

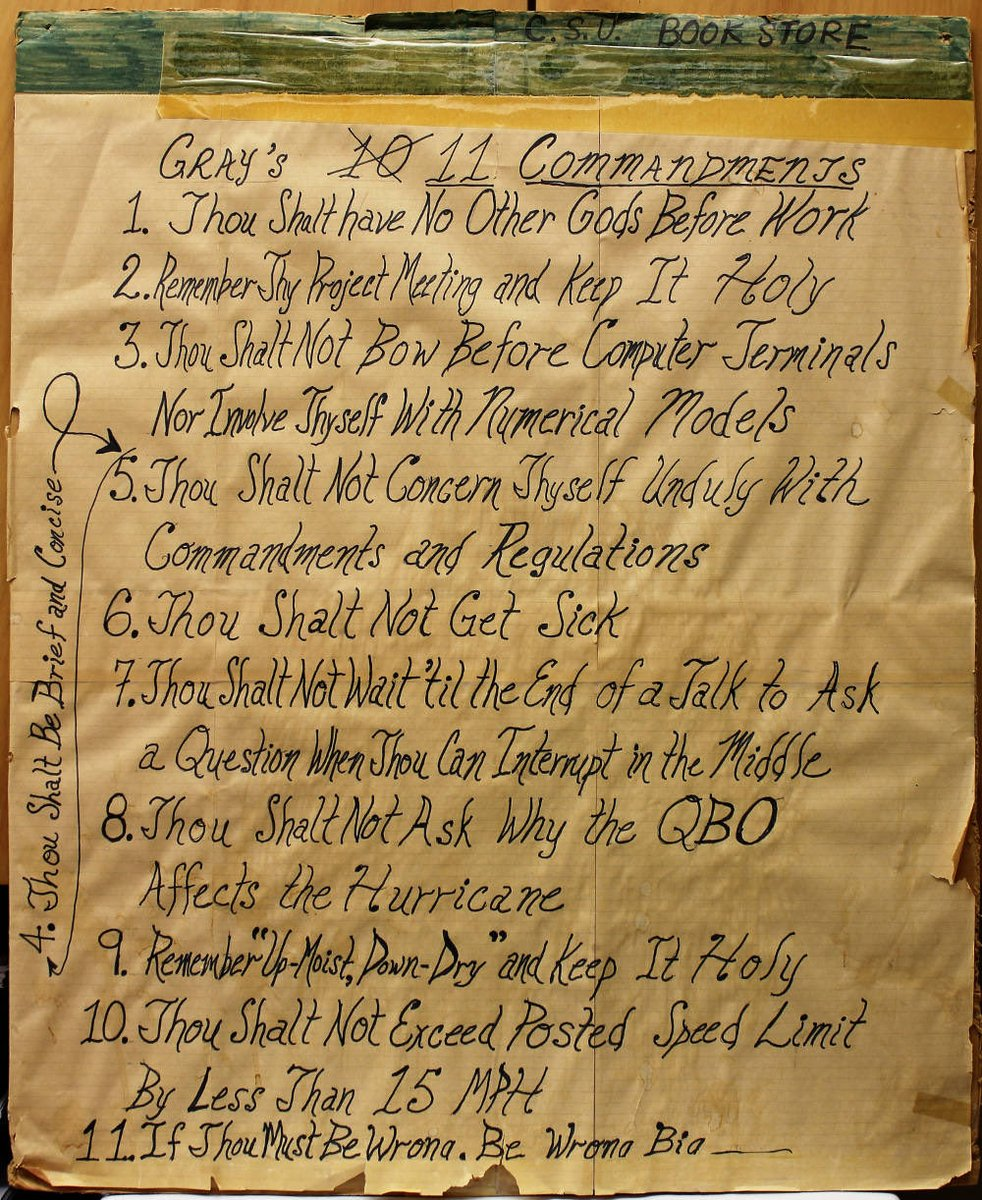
Photo of William Gray's "10/11 Commandments" on his office door

Gray offered his students advice including his commandments. One of them was "Remember Up-Moist, Down-Dry and Keep it Holy" which was the reference to his conviction that one has to include moisture processes such as evaporation and rainfall to understand atmospheric energy balance. "Thou Shalt Not Concern Thyself Unduly with Commandments and Regulations" expressed his disdain for bureaucracy. Being an observational atmospheric scientist, he detested numerical models of the atmosphere—T"hou Shalt Not Bow Before Computer Terminals Nor Involve Thyself with Numerical Models". He held very lively group meetings with his students and encouraged them to question everything—Remember "Thy Project Meeting and Keep it Holy, Thou Shalt Not Wait 'til the End of a Talk to Ask a Question When Thou Can Interrupt in the Middle".

== Personal life ==
On 1 October 1954, Gray married Nancy Price and they had four children together: Sarah, Anne (deceased), Janet, and Robert. They remained married until Price's death in 2001. Gray was a fan of baseball and followed the then Washington Senators (now known as the Texas Rangers). He initially sought a career in baseball or basketball but a knee injury at age 21 prevented him from pursuing such.

== Research ==
Among Gray's most prominent achievements were the establishment of seasonal hurricane forecasts and finding that hurricane activity is cyclical. He is widely regarded as a pioneer in hurricane research, particularly for the seasonal forecasts. Throughout his career, Gray published more than 80 papers and 60 research reports. Klotzbach referred to him as "one of the greatest minds in hurricane research".

=== Seasonal hurricane forecasts ===
In the late 1970s, Gray noticed a trend of low hurricane activity in the North Atlantic basin during El Niño years. He was the first researcher to make a connection between such events and positive results led him to pursue further research. He found numerous factors across the globe influence tropical cyclone activity, such as connecting wet periods over the African Sahel to an increase in major hurricane landfalls along the United States East Coast. However, his findings also showed inconsistencies when only looking at a single factor as a primary influence.

Utilizing his findings, Gray developed an objective, statistical forecast for seasonal hurricane activity; he predicted only the number of tropical storms, hurricanes, and major hurricanes, foregoing specifics on tracks and potential landfalls due to the aforementioned inconsistencies. Gray issued his first seasonal forecast ahead of the 1984 season, which used the statistical relationships between tropical cyclone activity, the El Niño–Southern Oscillation (ENSO), Quasi-biennial oscillation (QBO), and Caribbean basin sea-level pressures. The endeavor proved modestly successful. He subsequently issued forecasts ahead of the start of the Atlantic hurricane season in May and before the peak of the season in August. Students and colleagues joined his forecast team in the following years, including Christopher Landsea, Paul W. Mielke Jr., and Kenneth J. Berry.

After the 2005 Atlantic hurricane season, Gray announced that he was stepping back from the primary authorship of CSU's tropical cyclone probability forecasts, passing the role to Philip J. Klotzbach. Gray indicated that he would be devoting more time to the issue of global warming. He did not attribute global warming to anthropogenic causes, and was critical of those who did.

=== Climate change ===
Following Gray's retirement from CSU's faculty, he took a stance against anthropogenic global warming. Gray claimed that scientists supported the scientific consensus on climate change because they were afraid of losing grant funding and promoted by government leaders and environmentalists seeking world government. Although he agreed that global warming was taking place, he argued that humans were only responsible for a tiny portion and it was largely part of the Earth's natural cycle. In June 2011, Gray wrote a paper directed at the American Meteorological Society, opposing their embrace of anthropogenic global warming.

While his thoughts on climate change were well known among his students and presented at several conferences, they were never published in the peer-reviewed literature.

Peter Webster, a Georgia Institute of Technology professor, was part of the anonymous peer review on several of Gray's National Science Foundation proposals. In every case he has turned down the global warming research component because he believed it was not up to standards, but recommended that Gray's hurricane research be funded. Webster, who co-authored papers with Gray, was critical of Gray for his personal attacks on the scientists with whom he disagreed.

== Awards and honors ==
Throughout his career, Gray received several awards for his pioneering research and mentorship:

- Fellow at the American Meteorological Society (AMS)
- 1992: Colorado State University Jack E. Cermak Graduate School Award for Outstanding Adviser
- 1993: Co-recipient of the American Meteorological Society Banner I. Miller Award
- 1993: American Meteorological Society Jule G. Charney Award
- 1995: Neil Frank Award of the National Hurricane Conference for "pioneering research into long-range hurricane forecasting and for developing a better understanding of how global climatological conditions shape the creation and intensity of tropical cyclones."
- 1995: Honorary lifetime achievement award via invitation to the Eighth IMO Lecture to the 12th World Meteorological Organization Congress in Geneva, Switzerland.
- 1995: ABC Television person of the week
- 1995: Man of Science Award from the Colorado Chapter of the Achievement Rewards for College Scientists
- 2014: First-ever recipient of the Robert and Joanne Simpson Award
