= Nicolas Gruber =

Peruvian and Swiss climatologist

Nicolas Gruber is a Peruvian and Swiss climatologist. He is a recipient of the Revelle Medal and an elected fellow of the American Geophysical Union. He teaches at ETH Zurich's Department of Environmental Systems Science.
