= Inez Fung =

American climatologist (born 1949)

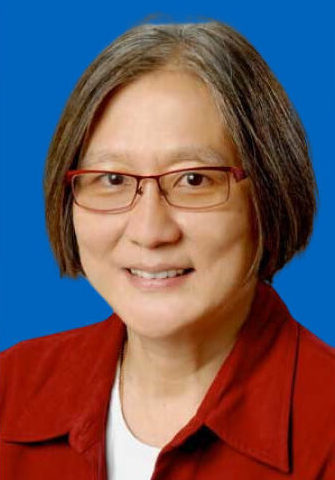
- Born: April 11, 1949 (age 77); British Hong Kong
- Education: Utica College; Massachusetts Institute of Technology (BS, MS, ScD)

Inez Fung (Chinese: 馮又嫦; born April 11, 1949) is a professor of atmospheric science at the University of California, Berkeley, jointly appointed in the department of earth and planetary science and the department of environmental science, policy and management. She is also the co-director of the Berkeley Institute of the Environment.

She is a member of both the National Academy of Sciences and the American Philosophical Society and a fellow in both the American Geophysical Union and the American Meteorological Society. Since 2021, she has been a member of the President’s Council of Advisors on Science and Technology (PCAST).

== Early life and education ==
Inez Fung was born and grew up in Hong Kong, which was then a British colony. She spoke Chinese at home and learned English at school. Her parents did not have secondary education and thought it was important for their four children to have educational opportunities. She graduated from King's College, Hong Kong, in 1967. In response to the 1967 Hong Kong riots, her family left Hong Kong for North America. She traveled to the United States and enrolled in Utica College in New York. Fung transferred to the Massachusetts Institute of Technology, receiving her Bachelor of Science in applied mathematics in 1971. Studying under Jule Gregory Charney at MIT, she wrote her doctoral thesis on the "organization of spiral rainbands in a hurricane," She won the Rossby Award for "outstanding thesis of the year." She received her Sc.D. in 1977, becoming the second woman to graduate from MIT with a doctorate in Meteorology.

== Career ==
She joined the National Academy of Sciences in 1977, working as a research associate until 1979 before she joined the Lamont–Doherty Earth Observatory at Columbia University, a position Fung held until 1986 when she was promoted to the position of Adjunct Associate Research Scientist at the Observatory. In 1986 she was also hired as a Physical Scientist for the NASA Goddard Space Flight Center's Goddard Institute for Space Studies. That same year she began to serve as a member of the National Academy of Sciences/National Research Council Climate Research Committee until 1989. She served as the Journal of Climate's associate editor from 1988 to 1989 and as the full-time editor from 1996 to 1998. In the spring of 1988, Fung was a visiting associate professor at the Institute of Environmental Studies at the University of Washington and was the adjunct professor, Division of Applied Mathematics, Department of Applied Physics at Columbia from 1989 to 1993. Fung was promoted to Adjunct Senior Scientist at the Lamont–Doherty Earth Observatory at Columbia and joined the University of Victoria in Canada, working as a professor in the School of Earth and Ocean Sciences in 1993. In 1998, Fung left the University of Victoria and the NASA Goddard Center, joining the University of California, Berkeley.

Since then, she has done extensive work on climate modeling, biogeochemical cycles, and climate change. During the last decade, she contributed to both the Intergovernmental Panel on Climate Change (IPCC) Third and Fourth Assessment reports.

In 2006, she joined with 17 other climate scientists to file an amicus curiae brief in Massachusetts v. EPA to support the need for the U.S. Environmental Protection Agency (EPA) to regulate carbon dioxide emissions.

== Personal life ==
Fung lives in Berkeley, California and is married to Oceanographer Jim Bishop, a professor at the University of California-Berkeley. In her personal time she enjoys science fiction movies.

== Honors and recognition ==
- 2019 Foreign Member of the Royal Society
- 2019 Carl-Gustaf Rossby Research Medal from the American Meteorological Society (AMS)
- 2010 Member of the Academia Sinica
- 2007 National Center for Atmospheric Research Community Climate System Model Distinguished Achievement Award
- 2005 Scientific American 50 award
- 2004 Roger Revelle Medal, American Geophysical Union
- 2002 Henry W. Kendall Memorial lecturer in Global Change Science, Massachusetts Institute of Technology
- 1997–2002 NASA Goddard Senior Fellow
- 1991 NOAA Distinguished Authorship Award
- 1990–1997 NASA Goddard Institute for Space Studies Most Valuable Paper Award
- 1989 NASA Exceptional Scientific Achievement Medal
- 1987–1993 NASA Goddard Institute for Space Studies Peer Award
- 1977 C.G. Rossby Award for the outstanding thesis of the year, Department of Meteorology, Massachusetts Institute of Technology
