= Rossby wave instability =

Concept in astrophysics

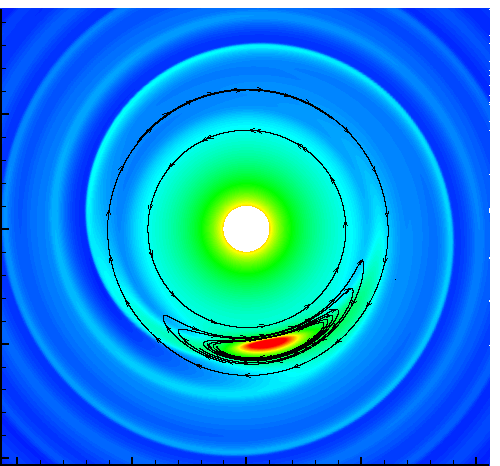
Rossby wave instability in a Keplerian disk.

Rossby Wave Instability (RWI) is a concept related to astrophysical accretion discs. In non-self-gravitating discs, for example around newly forming stars, the instability can be triggered by an axisymmetric bump, at some radius $r_0$, in the disc surface mass-density. It gives rise to exponentially growing non-axisymmetric perturbation in the vicinity of $r_0$ consisting of anticyclonic vortices. These vortices are regions of high pressure and consequently act to trap dust particles which in turn can facilitate planetesimal growth in proto-planetary discs. The Rossby vortices in the discs around stars and black holes may cause the observed quasi-periodic modulations of the disc's thermal emission.

Rossby waves, named after Carl-Gustaf Arvid Rossby, are important in planetary atmospheres and oceans and are also known as planetary waves. These waves have a significant role in the transport of heat from equatorial to polar regions of the Earth. They may have a role in the formation of the long-lived ($>300$ yr) Great Red Spot on Jupiter which is an anticyclonic vortex. The Rossby waves have the notable property of having the phase velocity opposite to the direction of motion of the atmosphere or disc in the comoving frame of the fluid.

The theory of the Rossby wave instability in accretion discs was developed by Lovelace et al. and Li et al. for thin Keplerian discs with negligible self-gravity and earlier by Lovelace and Hohlfeld for thin disc galaxies where the self-gravity may or may not be important and where the rotation is in general non-Keplerian.

The Rossby wave instability occurs because of the local wave trapping in a disc. It is related to the Papaloizou and Pringle instability; where the wave is trapped between the inner and outer radii of a disc or torus.
