= Bin Wang (meteorologist) =

Chinese meteorologist (born 1944)

Wang Bin
- 王斌
- Born: October 25, 1944 (age 81); Qingdao, Shandong, China
- Occupation: Meteorologist
- Years active: 1980s – present
- Awards: The Carl-Gustaf Rossby Research Medal 2015; Fellow, American Geophysical Union, 2013; Fellow, American Meteorological Society, 2009; University of Hawaii “Board of Regent’s Medal for Excellence in Research”, 2013

Bin Wang (Chinese: 王斌; pinyin: Wáng Bīn; born October 25, 1944) is a Chinese meteorologist who is an emeritus professor at University of Hawaii in Manoa.

== Career ==
Wang was a professor and chair at the Department of Meteorology at the University of Hawai‘i and a team leader at the International Pacific Research Center.

Wang is a noted meteorologist specializing in climate and atmospheric dynamics and has pioneered greater understanding of the dynamics and predictability of tropical climate and global monsoons in the Asian-Pacific region.

Wang was elected as a fellow of the American Meteorological Society in 2008 in recognition of his distinguished contributions to atmospheric research and service to the community.

Wang's research papers has over 28,000 citations.

== Awards ==
He received the Scientist of the Year award from ARCS Foundation in 2012.

Wang was awarded The Regents’ Medal for Excellence in Research in 2013. This is awarded by the University of Hawaii Board of Regents in recognition of scholarly contributions that expand the boundaries of knowledge and enrich the lives of students and the community.

He won the Carl-Gustaf Rossby Research Medal 2015. The Carl-Gustaf Rossby Research Medal is the highest award for atmospheric science of the American Meteorological Society. It is presented to individuals on the basis of outstanding contributions to the understanding of the structure or behavior of the atmosphere.
