= Peter J. Webster =

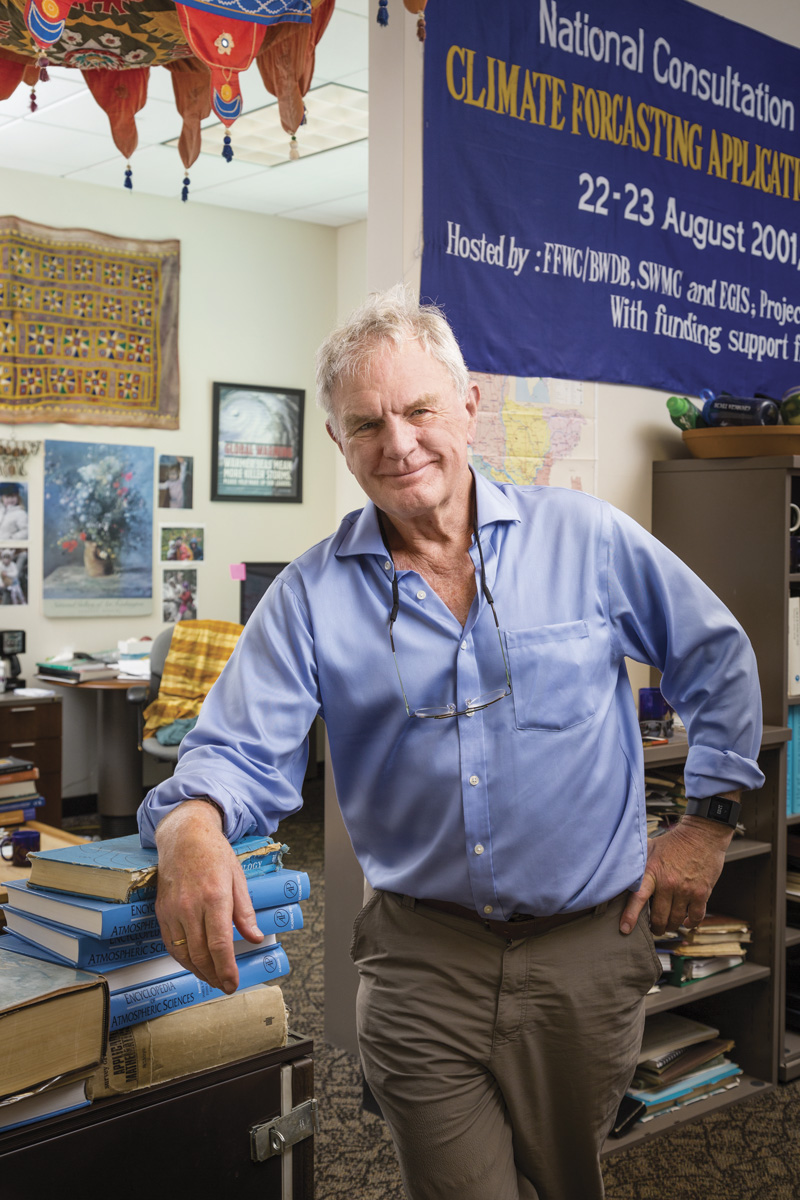
- Born: Stockport, Lancashire UK, 1942 (age 74)
- Education: Massachusetts Institute of Technology
- Known for: Low latitude dynamics of atmospheres and oceans. Hydrometeorology and predictions of extreme weather events for Asia.
- Awards: Prince Sultan Bin Abdulaziz International Prize for Water: Creative Award; International Award: American Geophysical Union; 116th Sir Edmund Halley Lecturer, Oxford University; Carl-Gustav Rossby Research Medal: American Meteorological Society; Mason Gold Medal: Royal Meteorological Society; Adrian Gill Prize: Royal Meteorological Society; Jule G. Charney Research Award: American Meteorological Society
- Scientific career
- Fields: Tropical climate dynamics, hydrology
- Doctoral advisor: Norman A. Phillips
- Website: webster.eas.gatech.edu

Peter John Webster is a meteorologist and climate dynamicist relating to the dynamics of large-scale coupled ocean-atmosphere systems of the tropics, notably the Asian monsoon. Webster holds degrees in applied physics, mathematics and meteorology. Webster studies the basic dynamics of the coupled ocean-atmosphere system in the tropics and has applied this basic knowledge to developing warning systems for extreme weather events in Asia. He has served on a number of prestigious national and international committees including the World Climate Research Program's Joint Scientific Committee (1983-1987), chaired the international Tropical Ocean Global Atmospheric (TOGA) organizing committee (1988–94) and was co-organizer of the multinational TOGA Couple Ocean-Atmosphere (1993). He is Emeritus Professor in Earth and Atmospheric Sciences at Georgia Institute of Technology and co-founder and Chief Scientist of Climate Forecast Applications Network LLC, a weather and climate services company.

== Education ==
Webster attended Melbourne High School, in Melbourne, Australia, graduating in 1960. He received a BSc in Applied Physics and Mathematics from the Royal Melbourne Institute of Technology in 1967. After working as a forecaster with the Australian Bureau of Meteorology, Webster attended the Massachusetts Institute of Technology where he was awarded his doctoral degree in 1972.

== Academic career ==
After graduating from MIT, he returned to Australia as where he was a research scientist at the Commonwealth Scientific and Industrial Research Organization (CSIRO). Webster then joined the faculty of the Department of Meteorology at The Pennsylvania State University. In 1992, he moved to University of Colorado as the inaugural Director of the Program in Atmospheric and Oceanic Sciences (PAOS). In 2002, he joined the faculty of the School of Earth and Atmospheric Sciences at the Georgia Institute of Technology. Over his academic career, Webster has mentored and graduated 31 Ph.D. students and mentored 14 post-doctoral scholars.

Webster has authored over 200 papers and three books. Research topics range from the low-frequency variability of the climate systems to the prediction of weather hazards in South Asia.

Webster and colleagues have shown the importance of interactions with the ocean in understanding the South Asian monsoon, whereby these interactions regulate the intensity of the monsoon. Anomalously strong monsoon states can lead La Nina and El Nino events. Recent research suggests that monsoon rainfall has actually increased in the last three decades, contrary to the expectation from global climate models.

Webster identified a new oscillation between the eastern and western Indian Ocean that changes polarity quasi-biennially. The Indian Ocean Dipole has emerged as an integral part of variations of the intensity of the South Asian Monsoon.

Webster's most controversial research relates to the increasing intensity of tropical cyclones with increasing sea surface temperature. Analysis of tropical cyclone data in the satellite era indicated that tropical storms had become more intense, although not more frequent, since 1972 as global SSTs have risen globally. This paper, has proven controversial with a vocal support and opposition from the different sides of the global warming debate Recent studies using contemporary data have tended to support the earlier conclusions.

== Climate Forecast Applications Network ==
Peter Webster is co-founder and Chief Scientist of Climate Forecast Applications Network, LLC (CFAN). CFAN develops weather and climate forecast tools to help clients manage weather and climate risks. CFAN was founded in 2006 by Judith Curry and Peter Webster and launched under Georgia Tech's Enterprise Innovation Institute VentureLab program.

The project that launched CFAN was Climate Forecast Applications in Bangladesh (CFAB). In 1998, 60% Bangladesh was inundated for over three months as the Brahmaputra River and Ganges flooded simultaneously, with devastating impacts. USAID asked Webster if it was possible to forecast the arrival of floods with sufficient lead-time to allow remedial actions to be taken. Prior to this time, floods would arrive unheralded often with devastation and loss. A 1-10 day hydrological forecast model was developed in 2000, which became operational in 2003. The prediction scheme continues to be used in Bangladesh through the Regional Integrated Multi-Hazard Early Warning System (RIMES) based in Bangkok, Thailand. Following three years of summer floods in Pakistan, a more advanced scheme was developed for the Indus Valley but has not been used by Pakistan authorities. Webster has continued to call for improved weather forecasts for South Asia, particularly in context of Cyclone Nargis that struck Myanmar and the storm surge from Super Typhoon Haiyan.

== Major recognition and awards ==
=== Awards ===
2018: Bjerknes Lecture, American Geophysical Union: “A new paradigm for Tropical-Extratropical Interaction”

2016: Prince Sultan Bin Abdulaziz International Prize for Water: Creativity Prize. United Nations Headquarters, November "For the development of extended range flood forecast systems that allow citizens and government authorities of developing nations to assess risk and take necessary mitigative actions, and for envisioning a plan that will allow nations to increase resilience to longer-term environmental hydrological problems associated with global climate change"

2015: International Award: American Geophysical Union

2015: 116th Sir Edmund Halley Lecturer, Oxford University “Understanding the Monsoon"

2014: Haurwitz Lecture, American Meteorological Society: “Towards a general theory of the monsoon”

2012: Mason Gold Medal: Royal Meteorological Society

2004: Carl-Gustav Rossby Research Medal: American Meteorological Society

2003: Adrian Gill Prize: Royal Meteorological Society

1990: Jule G. Charney Research Award: American Meteorological Society “Interactions between climate and tropical cyclones”

=== Fellowships ===
Honorary Fellow Royal Meteorological Society: May 2017

Honorary Fellow Chinese-American Oceanic and Atmospheric Association: 2014

American Association for the Advancement of Science: 2005

American Geophysical Union: 2000

American Meteorological Society: 1984

Royal Meteorological Society: 1984

== Publications ==
Thermodynamics of Atmospheres and Oceans. International Geophysics Series, Academic press, Volume 65, 471 pp. 471.: Curry, J. A. and P. J. Webster, 1998

Sustainability and Poverty Alleviation: Confronting Environmental Threats in Sindh: Ernesto, Sánchez-Triana, Santiago Enriquez, Bjorn Larsen, Peter Webster, and Javaid Afzal, 2015 (June), 264pp

Large scale Dynamics of the Tropical Atmosphere and Oceans.: 2018: Wiley (April 2020), 501pp.
