= Orographic precipitation =

Precipitation caused by mountainous terrain

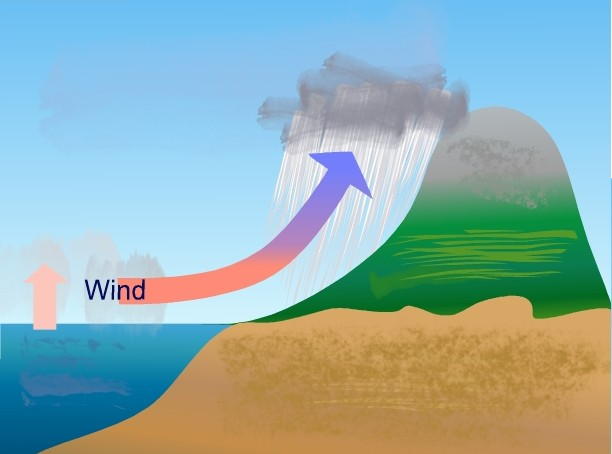
Orographic precipitation occurs when moist air is forced upwards by terrain.

Orographic precipitation, also known as relief precipitation, is precipitation generated by a forced upward movement of air upon encountering a physiographic upland.

== Cause ==
This lifting can be caused by:

1. Upward deflection of large-scale horizontal flow by the orography.
2. Anabatic or upward vertical propagation of moist air up an orographic slope, caused by daytime heating of the mountain barrier surface.

Upon ascent, the air that is being lifted expands and cools adiabatically. This adiabatic cooling of a rising moist air parcel may lower its temperature to its dew point, thus allowing for condensation of the water vapor contained within it, and hence the formation of a cloud. If enough water vapor condenses into cloud droplets, these droplets may become large enough to fall to the ground as precipitation.

Terrain-induced precipitation is a major factor for meteorologists to consider when they forecast the local weather. Orography can play a major role in determining the type, amount, intensity, and duration of precipitation events. The intensity of orographic precipitation is strongly controlled by the incoming atmospheric moisture flux and the slope of the terrain, which together determine the amount of condensation generated as moist airflow is forced to rise over topography. Computer models simulating these factors have shown that narrow barriers and steeper slopes produce stronger updraft speeds, which in turn increase orographic precipitation.

== Locations ==
Orographic precipitation is known to occur on oceanic islands, such as the Hawaiian Islands and New Zealand; much of the rainfall received on such islands is on the windward side, and the leeward side tends to be quite dry, almost desert-like. This phenomenon results in substantial local gradients in the amount of average rainfall, with coastal areas receiving on the order of 20 to 30 inches (510 to 760 mm) per year, and interior uplands receiving over 100 inches (2,500 mm) per year. Leeward coastal areas are especially dry—less than 20 in (510 mm) per year at Waikiki—and the tops of moderately high uplands are especially wet—about 475 in (12,100 mm) per year at Waiʻaleʻale on Kauaʻi.

Another area in which orographic precipitation is known to occur is the Pennines in the north of England: the west side of the Pennines receives more rain than the east because the clouds are forced up and over the hills and cause the rain to tend to fall on the western slopes. This is particularly noticeable between Manchester (to the west) and Leeds (to the east); Leeds receives less rain due to a rain shadow of 12 miles (19 km) from the Pennines.
