= Abraham H. Oort =

American climatologist (born 1934)

- Born: 1934 (age 91–92); Leiden, Netherlands
- Education: Utrecht University
- Scientific career
- Fields: Climatology
- Workplaces: Princeton University

Abraham Hans Oort (born 1934 in Leiden, Netherlands) is a Dutch-born American climatologist.

Oort is the son of the Dutch astronomer Jan Hendrik Oort. He moved to the United States in 1961. Since 1971, Oort was professor at Princeton University, where from 1977 until his retirement in 1996 he worked at the Geophysical Fluid Dynamics Laboratory/NOAA. Oort is best known for his textbook, Physics of Climate, written in conjunction with José P. Peixoto.
