= Joseph B. Klemp =

American atmospheric scientist

Joe Klemp
- Education: Stanford University (Ph.D., 1971)
- Known for: Numerical simulations illuminating atmospheric dynamics
- Awards: Carl-Gustaf Rossby Research Medal
- Scientific career
- Fields: Chemical engineering, atmospheric sciences
- Workplaces: National Center for Atmospheric Research
- Thesis: Extensions of Laminar Boundary Layer Theory to Flows with Separation (1971)
- Doctoral advisor: Andreas Acrivos

Joseph Bernard Klemp is an American atmospheric scientist who collaborated in groundbreaking work advancing numerical simulation techniques and uncovering the dynamics of atmospheric convection, including supercell thunderstorms, tornadoes, squall lines, as well as mountain waves.

== See also ==
- National Center for Supercomputing Applications
