= Hurd Curtis Willett =

American meteorologist

Hurd C. Willett
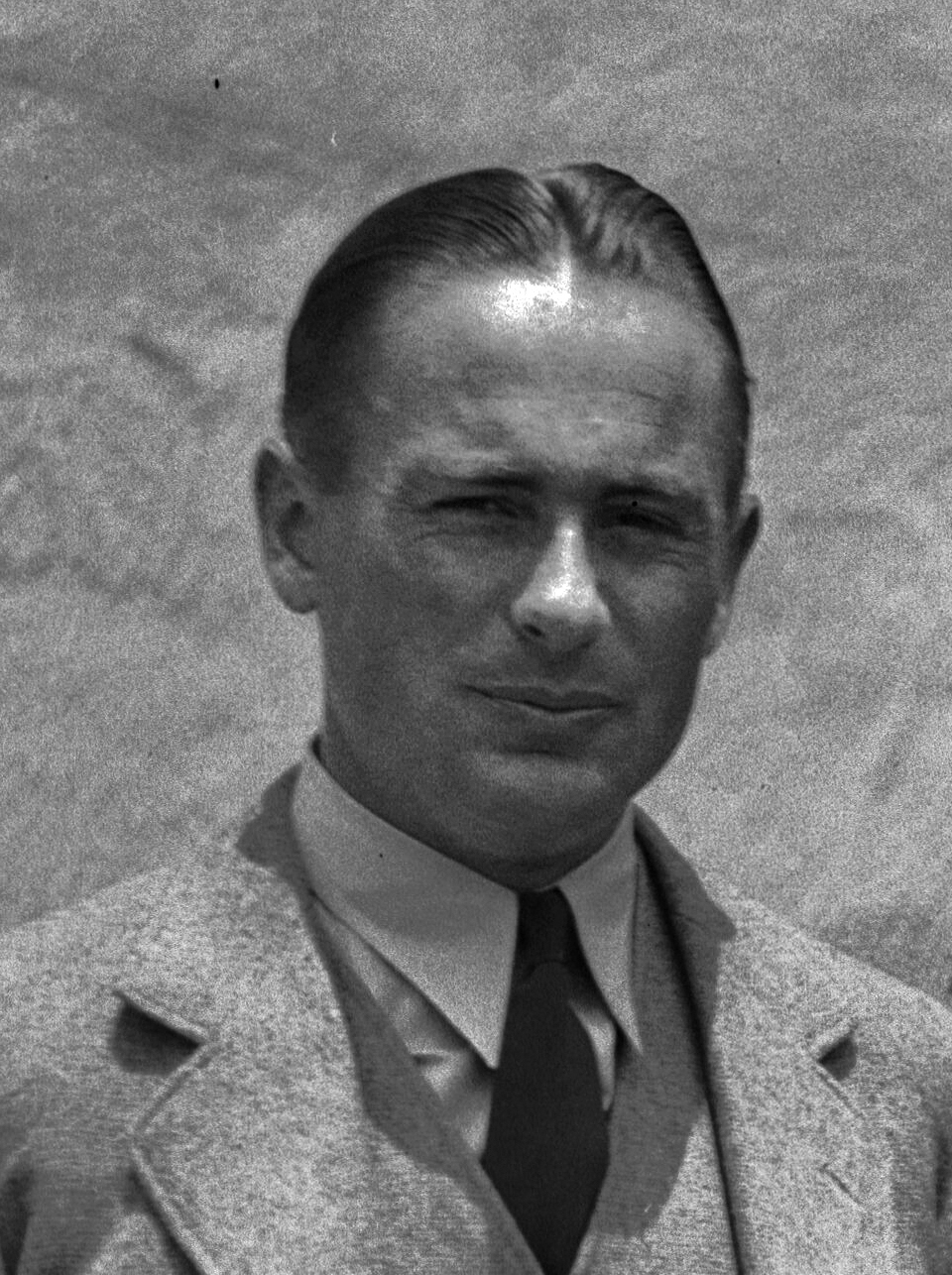
- Willett in 1934
- Born: January 1, 1903; Providence, Rhode Island, U.S.
- Died: March 26, 1992 (aged 89); West Concord, Massachusetts, U.S.
- Education: Princeton University (B.S., 1924); George Washington University (Ph.D., 1929)
- Awards: Carl-Gustaf Rossby Research Medal (inaugural)
- Scientific career
- Fields: Meteorology
- Workplaces: Massachusetts Institute of Technology
- Thesis: The Forecasting of Smoke, Haze and Fog

Hurd Curtis Willett (January 1, 1903 – March 26, 1992) was an American meteorologist known for his role in developing five-day weather forecasting techniques and widely known for his attempts at very long-range forecasting.

Born in Providence, Rhode Island, Willett grew up on a farm near Pittsburgh, Pennsylvania. He graduated with a B.S. degree from Princeton University in 1924, then worked at the U.S. Weather Bureau, and earned a doctorate in meteorology from George Washington University (GWU) in 1929. Willett won a Guggenheim Fellowship to study then burgeoning polar front theory, what became known as the Bergen School of Meteorology, in Norway. He joined the Massachusetts Institute of Technology (MIT) faculty in 1929, where he headed the development and adoption of the polar front theory of five-day weather prediction by the Weather Bureau. In 1951 he received a plaque from the American Meteorological Society (AMS) for Extraordinary Scientific Achievement. This was the initial prize award of what is now known as the Carl-Gustaf Rossby Research Medal.

Willett was a member of the American Academy of Arts and Sciences (AASC), the American Meteorological Society, the Royal Meteorological Society (RMetS), the Association of American Geographers (AAG), the American Geophysical Union (AGU), the American Association for the Advancement of Science (AAAS), Sigma Xi, and Phi Beta Kappa.

Willett first married Cynthia Jump and they had two sons and a daughter. They divorced and later he married Dorothy Bachman Lloyd and had another son and daughter. He died in West Concord, Massachusetts, after suffering a stroke.
