= John Michael Wallace =

American atmospheric scientist

John Michael Wallace (born October 28, 1940), is a professor of Atmospheric Sciences at the University of Washington, as well as the former director of the Joint Institute for the Study of the Atmosphere and Ocean (JISAO)—a joint research venture between the University of Washington and the National Oceanic and Atmospheric Administration (NOAA). His is the winner of the 2024 Japan Prize along with Sir Brian Hoskins in the field of "Resources, Energy, the Environment, and Social Infrastructure" for "Establishment of a scientific foundation for understanding and predicting extreme weather events"

His research concerns understanding global climate and its variations using observations and covers the quasi biennial oscillation, Pacific decadal oscillation and the annular modes of the Arctic oscillation and the Antarctic oscillation, and the dominant spatial patterns in month-to-month and year-to-year climate variability, including the one through which El Niño phenomenon in the tropical Pacific influences climate over North America. He is also the coauthor with Peter V. Hobbs of what is generally considered the standard introductory textbook in the field: Atmospheric Science: An Introductory Survey. He was the third most cited geoscientist during the period 1973–2007.

== Awards ==
- 2024 Japan Prize
- 1993 Carl-Gustaf Rossby Research Medal of the American Meteorological Society
- 1999 Roger Revelle Medal of the American Geophysical Union
- 2016 Symons Gold Medal of the Royal Meteorological Society
