= Victor P. Starr =

Victor Paul Starr (March 23, 1909 – March 14, 1976) was an American meteorologist and professor at Massachusetts Institute of Technology from 1947 to 1974. For his contributions to atmospheric science, he received the Carl-Gustaf Rossby Research Medal in 1961.
