= Rossby whistle =

Concept in physical oceanography

The Rossby whistle is the oscillation of sea-level and bottom pressure in the Caribbean Sea with the period of 120 days and influenced by propagating westward oceanic Rossby wave.

It is observed that a baroclinic Rossby wave propagating westward across the Caribbean Sea, oscillating with a period of 120 days, is rapidly returned to the east along the southern boundary as coastal shelf waves. The porous boundary of the Caribbean Sea results in this oscillation influencing a mass exchange with the wider ocean, leading to an almost uniform bottom pressure variability over the Grenada, Venezuela, and Colombia basins. These observations are based on satellite observation of the sea-level, monthly means of basin-averaged ocean bottom pressure using GRACE data, tide gauge measurements, and data from a bottom pressure recorder. The oscillation was first found in a numerical modelling simulation, from which is shown one cycle of the least squares fit of (left) sea level and (right) bottom pressure on basin averaged bottom pressure in the Caribbean Sea.

== Analogy to a whistle ==
Many atmospheric and oceanic phenomena are periodic (for example seasons) and the Caribbean Sea is one such example. However, there is an interesting analogy to the operation of a whistle in the way water flows into the semi-enclosed Caribbean Sea, flows out of it, and interacts within that basin. The net inflow and outflow required to explain the basin-averaged pressure signal is only a tiny fraction (about 1/1000) of the observed changes in flows through individual straits. This means that the bottom pressure signal is a side effect of the oscillating mode operating in a basin which can exchange mass with the wider ocean. This is analogous to the operation of a whistle or similar musical instrument. An organ pipe is a system in which the instability of a jet of air on encountering an obstacle generates eddies, and those eddies interact with the natural acoustic modes of the organ pipe. That resonance results in an audible sound in a whistle only because it is open. Such analogy was also invoked by LaCasce who compared Rossby wave resonant behavior with acoustic waves in a clarinet. However, there is no audible sound emitted from the Caribbean Sea and it is also not heard from satellites missions such as Gravity Recovery and Climate Experiment which observes Earth's gravity field anomalies.

== See also ==
- Physics of whistles
