= Dave Fultz (meteorologist) =

American meteorologist (1921–2002)

- Born: August 12, 1921; Chicago, Illinois, U.S.
- Died: July 25, 2002 (aged 80); Chicago
- Spouse: Jean L. McEldowney (m. 1921; died 1998)
- Children: 3
- Awards: Guggenheim Fellowship (1950)

Dave Fultz (August 12, 1921 – July 25, 2002) was an American professor of meteorology, known for his research on atmospheric air movements and hydrodynamics.

Fultz received his bachelor's degree in 1941 and a certificate in meteorology in 1942 from the University of Chicago. In 1942 he was an assistant at the Chicago Station of the United States Weather Bureau. From 1942 to 1944 he was an instructor at the University of Puerto Rico, as well as a research associate at the University of Chicago. In 1945 he was an operations analyst for the United States Army Air Forces. In 1947 Fultz received his Ph.D. in meteorology from the University of Chicago, where he spent the remainder of his career. There he was from 1946 to 1992 head of the Hydrodynamics Laboratories. From 1947 to 1948 he was an instructor in meteorology and in 1948 was appointed an assistant professor. In 1960 he was promoted from associate professor to full professor, retiring in 1992 as professor emeritus. From 1959 to 1963 he was a member of the U.S. Air Force's Scientific Advisory Board.

Fultz’s honors include election to the National Academy of Sciences in 1975. He also received the Clarence Leroy Meisinger Award from the American Meteorological Society in 1951, and the Carl-Gustaf Rossby Research Medal, the society’s highest honor for atmospheric scientists, in 1967. Fultz in fact studied under Rossby, one of the original investigators of the jet stream and the founder of the University of Chicago’s meteorology department.

Fultz was a Guggenheim Fellow for the academic year 1950–1951 at the University of Cambridge.

Dave Fultz ... asked the following question: what factors are essential to generating the complexity of actual weather? Is it a process that depends on the full complexity of the world — the interaction of ocean currents and the atmosphere, the locations of mountain ranges, the alternation of the seasons, and so on — or does the basic pattern of weather, for all its complexity, have simple roots? He was able to show the essential simplicity of the weather's causes with a "model" that consisted of a dish-pan filled with water, placed on a slowly rotating turntable, with an electric heating element bent around the outside of the pan. Aluminum flakes were suspended in the water, so that a camera perched overhead and rotating with the pan could take pictures of the pattern of flow.

He married Jean L. McEldowney (1921–1998) on April 6, 1946. They had two daughters and a son.

The Dave Fultz Memorial Laboratory for Hydrodynamics was officially opened in June 2005.

== Selected publications ==
- Fultz, Dave (1949). "A Preliminary Report on Experiments with Thermally Produced Lateral Mixing in a Rotating Hemispherical Shell of Liquid". Journal of Meteorology. 6 (1): 17–33. Bibcode:1949JAtS....6...17F. doi:10.1175/1520-0469(1949)006<0017:APROEW>2.0.CO;2. ISSN 1520-0469.
- Fultz, Dave (1950). "Experimental studies related to atmospheric flow around obstacles". Geofisica Pura e Applicata. 17 (3–4): 88–93. Bibcode:1950GeoPA..17...88F. doi:10.1007/BF02018345. ISSN 0033-4553. S2CID 128495001.
- Fultz, Dave (1951). "Experimental Analogies to Atmospheric Motions". Compendium of Meteorology. pp. 1235–1248. doi:10.1007/978-1-940033-70-9_100. ISBN 978-1-940033-70-9.
- Fultz, Dave (1951). "Non-Dimensional Equations and Modeling Criteria for the Atmosphere". Journal of Meteorology. 8 (4): 262–267. Bibcode:1951JAtS....8..262F. doi:10.1175/1520-0469(1951)008<0262:NDEAMC>2.0.CO;2. ISSN 1520-0469.
- Fultz, Dave (1952). "On the Possibility of Experimental Models of the Polar-Front Wave". Journal of Meteorology. 9 (6): 379–384. Bibcode:1952JAtS....9..379F. doi:10.1175/1520-0469(1952)009<0379:OTPOEM>2.0.CO;2. ISSN 1520-0469.
- Fultz, D.; Frenzen, P. (1955). "A Note on Certain Interesting Ageostrophic Motions in a Rotating Hemispherical Shell". Journal of Meteorology. 12 (4): 332–338. Bibcode:1955JAtS...12..332F. doi:10.1175/1520-0469(1955)012<0332:ANOCIA>2.0.CO;2. ISSN 1520-0469.
- Fultz, D. (1959). "A Note on Overstability and the Elastoid-Inertia Oscillations of Kelvin, Solberg, and Bjerknes". Journal of Meteorology. 16 (2): 199–208. Bibcode:1959JAtS...16..199F. doi:10.1175/1520-0469(1959)016<0199:ANOOAT>2.0.CO;2. ISSN 1520-0469.
- Fultz, Dave; Long, Robert R.; Owens, George V.; Bohan, Walter; Kaylor, Robert; Weil, Joyce (1959). Studies of Thermal Convection in a Rotating Cylinder with Some Implications for Large-Scale Atmospheric Motions. pp. 1–104. doi:10.1007/978-1-940033-37-2_1. ISBN 978-1-940033-37-2.
- Donnelly, R. J.; Fultz, D. (1960). "Experiments on the stability of spiral flow between rotating cylinders". Proceedings of the National Academy of Sciences. 46 (8): 1150–1154. Bibcode:1960PNAS...46.1150D. doi:10.1073/pnas.46.8.1150. ISSN 0027-8424. PMC 223015. PMID 16590728.
- Donnelly, R. J.; Fultz, D. (1960). "Experiments on the stability of viscous flow between rotating cylinders II. Visual observations". Proceedings of the Royal Society of London. Series A. Mathematical and Physical Sciences. 258 (1292): 101–123. Bibcode:1960RSPSA.258..101D. doi:10.1098/rspa.1960.0177. ISSN 2053-9169. S2CID 123528327.
- Fultz, Dave (1962). "An experimental note on finite-amplitude standing gravity waves". Journal of Fluid Mechanics. 13 (2): 193–212. Bibcode:1962JFM....13..193F. doi:10.1017/S0022112062000622. ISSN 0022-1120. S2CID 122786800.
