= Carl Mears =

Carl Mears is a Senior Scientist, at Remote Sensing Systems, since 1998. He has worked on validation of SSM/I derived winds, and rain-flagging algorithm for the QuikScat scatterometer. He is best known for his work with Frank Wentz in developing a satellite temperature record from MSU and AMSU. Intercomparison of this record with the earlier UAH satellite temperature record, developed by John Christy and Roy Spencer, revealed deficiencies in the earlier work; specifically, the warming trend in the RSS version is larger than the UAH one.

Mears was a major contributor to Temperature Trends in the Lower Atmosphere: Steps for Understanding and Reconciling Differences, the first released report from the US Climate Change Science Program. He also contributed to the IPCC Fourth Assessment Report Working Group one report, Climate Change 2007 - The Physical Science Basis.

== Education ==
- B.S. in physics from the University of Washington (1985)
- PhD. in physics from the University of California, Berkeley (1991)

== Service ==
- convening lead author for the U.S. Climate Change Science Program Synthesis and Assessment product 1.1
- contributing author to the IPCC 4th assessment report, chapter 3 Observations: Surface and Atmospheric Climate Change .
- member of the Global Climate Observing System Working Group on Atmospheric Reference Observations
- member of the WCRP Stratospheric Trends Working Group, part of the Stratospheric Processes And their Role in Climate (SPARC) project.

== Selected publications ==
- Mears, C. A. and F. J. Wentz, (2009) Construction of the Remote Sensing Systems V3.2 Atmospheric Temperature Records From the MSU and AMSU Microwave Sounders, Journal of Atmospheric and Oceanic Technology, published online, doi:10.1175/2008JTECHA1176.1.
- Mears, C. A. and F. J. Wentz, (2005) The Effect of Diurnal Correction on Satellite-Derived Lower Tropospheric Temperature, doi:10.1126/science.1114772, Science, 309, 1548–1551.
- Mears, C. A., M. C. Schabel and F. J. Wentz, (2003) A Reanalysis of the MSU Channel 2 Tropospheric Temperature Record, Journal of Climate, 16(22), 3650–3664.
- Santer, B. D., T. M. L. Wigley, C. A. Mears, F. J. Wentz, S. A. Klein, D. J. Seidel, K. E. Taylor, P. W. Thorne, M. F. Wehner, P. J. Gleckler, J. S. Boyle, W. D. Collins, K. W. Dixon, C. Doutriaux, M. Free, Q. Fu, J. E. Hansen, G. S. Jones, R. Ruedy, T. R. Karl, J. R. Lanzante, G. A. Meehl, V. Ramaswamy, G. Russell and G. A. Schmidt, (2005) Amplification of Surface Temperature Trends and Variability in the Tropical Atmosphere, Science, 309(5740), 1511–1556.
