= Frank Wentz =

Frank Wentz is the CEO and director of Remote Sensing Systems, a company he founded in 1974, which specializes in satellite microwave remote sensing research. Together with Carl Mears, he is best known for developing a satellite temperature record from MSU and AMSU. Intercomparison of this record with the earlier UAH satellite temperature record, developed by John Christy and Roy Spencer, revealed deficiencies in the earlier work; specifically, the warming trend in the RSS version is larger than the University of Alabama in Huntsville (UAH) one. From 1978 to 1982, Wentz was a member of NASA's SeaSat Experiment Team involved in the development of physically based retrieval methods for microwave scatterometers and radiometers. He has also investigated the effect of climate change on satellite-derived evaporation, precipitation and surface wind values. His findings are different from most climate change model predictions.

== Education ==
- B.S. (1969) and M.S. (1971) in physics, Massachusetts Institute of Technology.

== Service ==
- Member of various NASA Science Teams
- National Research Council's Earth Studies Board
- National Research Council's Panel on Reconciling Temperature Observations
- A lead author for CCSP Synthesis and Assessment Product on Temperature Trends in the Lower Atmosphere

== Awards ==
- 2011: American Geophysical Union Fellow
- 2013: IEEE Geoscience and Remote Sensing Society Transactions Prize Paper for the paper "The emissivity of the ocean surface between 6 - 90 GHz over a large range of wind speeds and Earth incidence angles" (secondary author)
- 2015: American Meteorological Society Fellow
- 2015: Recipient of the AMS Verner E Suomi Award for "pioneering, painstaking work to accurately retrieve geophysical parameters from satellite microwave instruments and using these measurements to elucidate climate trends"

== Selected peer-reviewed publications ==
- Wentz, F. J., (1975) "A Two-Scale Scattering Model for Foam-Free Sea Microwave Brightness Temperatures", Journal of Geophysical Research, 80(24), 3441-3446
- Wentz, F. J., (1978) "The Forward Scattering of Microwave Solar Radiation From a Water Surface", Radio Science, 13(1), 131-138
- Wentz, F. J., (1983) "A Model Function for Ocean Microwave Brightness Temperatures", Journal of Geophysical Research, 88(C3), 1892-1908
- Wentz, F. J., S. Peteherych and L. A. Thomas, (1984) "A Model Function for Ocean Radar Cross-Sections at 14.6 GHz", Journal of Geophysical Research, 89(C3), 3689-3704
- Wentz, F. J., L. A. Mattox and S. Peteherych, (1986) "New Algorithms for Microwave Measurements of Ocean Winds: Applications to SeaSat and the Special Sensor Microwave Imager", Journal of Geophysical Research, 91(C2), 2289-2307
- Wentz, F. J., (1991) "A Simplified Wind Vector Algorithm for Satellite Scatterometers", Journal of Atmospheric and Oceanic Technology, 8(5), 697-714
- Wentz, F. J., (1992) "Measurement of Oceanic Wind Vector Using Satellite Microwave Radiometers", IEEE Transactions on Geoscience and Remote Sensing, 30(5), 960-972
- Wentz, F. J., (1997) "A Well Calibrated Ocean Algorithm for Special Sensor Microwave / Imager", Journal of Geophysical Research, 102(C4), 8703-8718
- Wentz, F. J. and R. W. Spencer, (1998) "SSM/I Rain Retrievals Within a Unified All-Weather Ocean Algorithm", Journal of the Atmospheric Sciences, 55(9), 1613–1627, {{doi:10.1175/1520-0469(1998)055<1613:SIRRWA>2.0.CO;2}}
- Wentz, F. J. and M. C. Schabel, (1998) "Effects of Satellite Orbital Decay on MSU Lower Tropospheric Temperature Trends", Nature, 394, 661-664
- Wentz, F. J. and D. K. Smith, (1999) "A Model Function for the Ocean-Normalized Radar Cross Section at 14 GHz Derived From NSCAT Observations", Journal of Geophysical Research, 104(C5), 11499–11514, {{doi:10.1029/98JC02148}}
- Wentz, F. J., C. L. Gentemann, D. K. Smith and D. B. Chelton, (2000) "Satellite Measurements of Sea Surface Temperature Through Clouds", Science, 288(5467), 847–850, {{doi:10.1126/science.288.5467.847}}
- Wentz, F. J. and M. C. Schabel, (2000) "Precise Climate Monitoring Using Complementary Satellite Data Sets", Nature, 403(6768), 414–416, {{doi:10.1038/35000184}}
- Wentz, F. J., P. D. Ashcroft and C. L. Gentemann, (2001) "Post-Launch Calibration of the TRMM Microwave Imager", IEEE Transactions on Geoscience and Remote Sensing, 39(2), 415–422, {{doi:10.1109/36.905249}}
- Wentz, F. J., L. Ricciardulli, K. A. Hilburn and C. A. Mears, (2007) "How Much More Rain Will Global Warming Bring?", Science, 317, 233–235, {{doi:10.1126/science.1140746}}
- Wentz, F. J., P. D. Ashcroft and C. L. Gentemann, (2001) "Post-Launch Calibration of the TRMM Microwave Imager", IEEE Transactions on Geoscience and Remote Sensing, 39(2), 415–422, {{doi:10.1109/36.905249}}
- Wentz, F. J., L. Ricciardulli, (2011) "Comment on "Global Trends in Wind Speed and Wave Height"", Science, 334, 905, {{doi:10.1126/science.1210317}}
- Meissner, T., and F. J. Wentz, (2012) "The emissivity of the ocean surface between 6 – 90 GHz over a large range of wind speeds and Earth incidence angles", IEEE Transactions on Geoscience and Remote Sensing, 50(8), 3004–3026, {{doi:10.1109/TGRS.2011.2179662}}
