= Differenced one-way doppler =

Satellite navigation and communications

Differenced one-way doppler (DOWD) is a method of spacecraft navigation. The process uses two TDRSS communications relay satellites receiving the same telemetry broadcast from a satellite. The Doppler shifts experienced by both TDRS satellites can be processed using ground equipment to generate trajectory estimates without the need for onboard GPS solutions. The Flight Dynamics Facility at GSFC provides this trajectory processing for NASA missions, though commercial software can also be used.

Before spacecraft GPS navigation was common, satellite navigation in Earth orbit required ground antennas or radar to follow a satellite's transponder signal and interpret range measurements, which could then be fed into a computer to determine the trajectory. The system continues to be in operation as of the third generation of TDRS satellites, which began operations in 2013.

The DOWD concept was described as early as 1980 and the capability was tested first on the WIND and NOAA-J satellite launches in 1994. While the trajectory estimates generated through DOWD for these tests were only marginally useful on their own, it was found that ground-based trajectory estimates were significantly improved by combining their results with the DOWD solution.
