= Remote Sensing Systems =

Remote Sensing Systems (RSS) is a private research company founded in 1974 by Frank Wentz. It processes microwave data from a variety of NASA satellites. Most of their research is supported by the Earth Science Enterprise program. The company is based in Santa Rosa, California.

== Satellite Temperature Record ==
RSS is a widely cited source of data on the satellite temperature record. Their data is one source of evidence for global warming. Research by Carl Mears, Matthias Schabel, and Wentz, all of RSS, highlighted errors in the early satellite temperature records compiled by John Christy and Roy Spencer at UAH, which had previously showed no significant temperature trend, bringing the derived satellite data into closer agreement with surface temperature trends, radiosonde data and computer models. The 2011 correction to UAH data is closer to the RSS data, but differences remain, for example, in the Lower Troposphere global average trend since 1979, RSS currently have +0.133K/decade while UAH has 0.140K/decade, while the mid-troposphere difference is even more marked at 0.079K/decade and 0.052K/decade respectively. However, in a recent online YouTube video, Dr. Carl Mears, a senior scientist with the team behind the satellite data, explained how he believes his data set needed correction.

I would have to say that the surface data seems more accurate because several groups analyze it, including some who set out to prove the others wrong, and they all get more or less the same answer.

In June 2017, version 4 of the TLT was released, and this substantially revised the trend from 1979 by 36%, from .135K per decade to .184K per decade.

Atmospheric measurements taken by a different satellite measurement technique, the Atmospheric Infrared Sounder on the Aqua satellite launched in 2002, show close agreement with surface data.
