= John Christy =

Climate scientist

John Raymond Christy
- Born: California, USA
- Education: California State University, University of Illinois, Golden Gate Baptist Seminary
- Known for: UAH satellite data
- Spouse(s): Babs (Joslin) Christy, 1975. Died 2014. Sherry (Upshaw) Christy, 2015
- Awards: 1991 Medal for Exceptional Scientific Achievement, NASA; 1996 Special Award, American Meteorological Society
- Scientific career
- Fields: Atmospheric Science
- Workplaces: University of Alabama in Huntsville (UAH)
- Thesis: An investigation of the general circulation associated with extreme anomalies in hemispheric mean atmospheric mass (1987)
- Doctoral advisor: Kevin Trenberth
- Website: nsstc.uah.edu/users/john.christy/

John Raymond Christy is a climate scientist at the University of Alabama in Huntsville (UAH) whose chief interests are satellite remote sensing of global climate and global climate change. He is best known, jointly with Roy Spencer, for the first successful development of a satellite temperature record, and for his rejection of the scientific consensus on climate change.

== Early life and education ==
A native of Fresno, California, Christy became interested in the weather when he was a child. He became curious why the weather in the San Joaquin Valley was so different from that of the Sierra Mountains. He has recalled that "I built my first climate datasets when I was 12, using a mechanical pencil, graph paper, and long-division (no calculators back then.) I've been a climate nerd ever since." He received a BA in mathematics from California State University, Fresno in 1973, and an MS and PhD in atmospheric sciences from the University of Illinois at Urbana–Champaign in 1984 and 1987. His doctoral thesis was titled, An investigation of the general circulation associated with extreme anomalies in hemispheric mean atmospheric mass.

Prior to his scientific career, Christy taught physics and chemistry as a missionary teacher in Nyeri, Kenya from 1973 to 1975. After earning a Master of Divinity degree from Golden Gate Baptist Seminary in 1978 he served four years as a bivocational mission-pastor in Vermillion, South Dakota, where he also taught college math.

== Career ==
He is the distinguished professor of atmospheric science and director of the Earth System Science Center at the University of Alabama in Huntsville (UAH). He was appointed Alabama's state climatologist in 2000. For his development of a global temperature data set from satellites, he was awarded NASA's Medal for Exceptional Scientific Achievement and the American Meteorological Society's "Special Award." In 2002, Christy was elected Fellow of the American Meteorological Society.

=== Satellite temperature record ===
Since 1989 Christy, along with Roy Spencer, has maintained an atmospheric temperature record derived from satellite microwave sounding unit measurements (see: satellite temperature record). This was once quite controversial: From the beginning of the satellite record in late 1978 into 1998 it showed a net global cooling trend, although ground measurements and instruments carried aloft by balloons showed warming in many areas. Part of the cooling trend seen by the satellites can be attributed to several years of cooler than normal temperatures and cooling caused by the eruption of the Mount Pinatubo volcano. Part of the discrepancy between the surface and atmospheric trends was resolved over a period of several years as Christy, Spencer and others identified several factors, including orbital drift and decay, that caused a net cooling bias in the data collected by the satellite instruments. Since the data correction of August 1998 (and the major La Niña Pacific Ocean warming event of the same year), data collected by satellite instruments have shown an average global warming trend in the atmosphere. From November 1978 through March 2011, Earth's atmosphere has warmed at an average rate of about 0.14 C per decade, according to the UAH satellite record.

Christy was a lead author of a section of the 2001 report by the IPCC and the U.S. CCSP report Temperature Trends in the Lower Atmosphere – Understanding and Reconciling Differences. Christy also signed the 2003 American Geophysical Union statement on climate change.

Christy has also performed detailed reconstruction of surface temperature for Central California. He found that recorded temperature changes there were consistent with an altered surface environment caused by increased irrigation for agriculture, which changed "a high-albedo desert into a darker, moister, vegetated plain."

== Views ==
A devout Baptist, Christy believes that "the use of carbon-based energy" is "needed to lengthen and enhance the quality of human life", which is the "moral imperative." He has argued that efforts to limit greenhouse pollution are "trying to control how others live".

In a 2003 interview with National Public Radio about the 2003 American Geophysical Union (AGU) statement, he said he is "a strong critic of scientists who make catastrophic predictions of huge increases in global temperatures and tremendous rises in sea levels". He added, though, that "it is scientifically inconceivable that after changing forests into cities, turning millions of acres into irrigated farmland, putting massive quantities of soot and dust into the air, and putting extra greenhouse gases into the air, that the natural course of climate has not changed in some way."

In a 2009 interview with Fortune magazine about signing the 2003 American Geophysical Union (AGU) statement, he said: "As far as the AGU, I thought that was a fine statement because it did not put forth a magnitude of the warming. We just said that human effects have a warming influence, and that's certainly true. There was nothing about disaster or catastrophe. In fact, I was very upset about the latest AGU statement [in 2007]. It was about alarmist as you can get."

In a 2007 editorial in The Wall Street Journal, he wrote: "I'm sure the majority (but not all) of my IPCC colleagues cringe when I say this, but I see neither the developing catastrophe nor the smoking gun proving that human activity is to blame for most of the warming we see."

In a 2009 written testimony to the U.S. House Ways and Means Committee, he wrote: "From my analysis, the actions being considered to 'stop global warming' will have an imperceptible impact on whatever the climate will do, while making energy more expensive, and thus have a negative impact on the economy as a whole. We have found that climate models and popular surface temperature data sets overstate the changes in the real atmosphere and that actual changes are not alarming."

In 2014, Christy and his UAH colleague Richard McNider wrote an op-ed in The Wall Street Journal, arguing that climate models projected temperatures consistently higher than real-world satellite and balloon data. The authors also pointed to past instances where scientific consensus turned out to be incorrect. However, his statements have been debunked by experts on this field.

In 2017, Christy argued on The Daily Caller, that climate models overestimated the impact of CO_{2}. Climate Feedback, a fact-checking website, found his claim to be false.

In 2025, Christy co-authored "A Critical Review of Impacts of Greenhouse Gas Emissions on the U.S. Climate", which is a report written for the U.S. Energy Secretary Christopher Wright.

== Awards ==
- 1991: NASA Exceptional Scientific Achievement Medal (with Roy Spencer).
- 1996: AMS Special Award "for developing a global, precise record of Earth's temperature from operational polar-orbiting satellites, fundamentally advancing our ability to monitor climate" (with Roy Spencer).

== See also ==
- Roy Spencer (scientist)
- UAH satellite temperature dataset

== Selected publications ==
=== Articles ===
- Christy, John R. (November 1, 2007). "My Nobel Moment". The Wall Street Journal.
- Christy, John R. (November 13, 2007). "No consensus on IPCC's level of ignorance". BBC News.

=== Peer-reviewed papers ===
- Spencer, Roy W.; Christy, John R. (1990). "Precise Monitoring of Global Temperature Trends from Satellites". Science. 247 (4950): 1558–1562. Bibcode:1990Sci...247.1558S. doi:10.1126/science.247.4950.1558. PMID 17782811. S2CID 22244815.
- Dutton, Ellsworth G.; Christy, John R. (1992). "Solar radiative forcing at selected locations and evidence for global lower tropospheric cooling following the eruptions of El Chichon and Pinatubo". Geophysical Research Letters. 19 (23): 2313–2316. Bibcode:1992GeoRL..19.2313D. doi:10.1029/92GL02495. Archived from the original on 2012-10-13.
- Christy, John R.; Spencer, Roy W.; Braswell, William D. (1999). "MSU Tropospheric Temperatures: Dataset Construction and Radiosonde Comparisons". Journal of Atmospheric and Oceanic Technology. 17 (9): 1153–1170. Bibcode:2000JAtOT..17.1153C. doi:10.1175/1520-0426(2000)017<1153:MTTDCA>2.0.CO;2. S2CID 17525134.
- Christy, John R.; Spencer, Roy W.; Norris, William B.; Braswella, William D.; Parker, David E. (2003). "Error Estimates of Version 5.0 of MSU–AMSU Bulk Atmospheric Temperatures". Journal of Atmospheric and Oceanic Technology. 20 (5): 613–629. Bibcode:2003JAtOT..20..613C. doi:10.1175/1520-0426(2003)20<613:EEOVOM>2.0.CO;2.
- Douglass, David H.; Christy, John R.; Pearson, Benjamin D.; Singer, S. Fred (2008). "A comparison of tropical temperature trends with model predictions". International Journal of Climatology. 28 (13): 1693–1701. Bibcode:2008IJCli..28.1693D. doi:10.1002/joc.1651. S2CID 10364112.
- Douglass, David H.; Christy, John R. (2009). "Limits on CO_{2} Forcing From Recent Temperature Data of Earth". Energy & Environment. 20 (1–2): 177–189. arXiv:0809.0581. Bibcode:2009EnEnv..20..177D. doi:10.1260/095830509787689277. S2CID 16927828.
- Christy, John R.; Herman, Benjamin; Pielke Sr., Roger; et al. (2010). "What Do Observational Datasets Say About Modeled Tropospheric Temperature Trends Since 1979?". Remote Sensing. 2 (9): 2148–2169. Bibcode:2010RemS....2.2148C. doi:10.3390/rs2092148.

In 2025, with Judith Curry, Steven E. Koonin, Ross McKitrick, and Roy Spencer, Christy was a member of the United States Department of Energy's Climate Working Group and a co-author of its A Critical Review of Impacts of Greenhouse Gas Emissions on the US Climate (23 July 2025)
