= Microwave sounding unit =

Satellite instrument for atmospheric monitoring

The microwave sounding unit (MSU) was the predecessor to the Advanced Microwave Sounding Unit (AMSU).

The MSU was first launched aboard the TIROS-N satellite in late 1978 and provided global coverage (from Pole to Pole). It carries a 4-channel microwave radiometer, operating between 50 and 60 GHz. Spatial resolution on the ground was 2.5 deg in longitude and latitude (about 250 km circle). There were 9 different MSUs launched; the most recent one on NOAA-14. They provided measurements of the temperature of the troposphere and lower stratosphere until 1998, when the first AMSU was deployed. AMSU provides many more channels and finer resolution (about 50 km).

Table 1 lists some characteristics of the MSU. The radiometer's antenna scans underneath the satellite through nadir, and its polarization vector rotates with the scan angle. In the table, "vertical polarization near nadir" means that the E-vector is parallel to the scan direction at nadir, and "horizontal polarization" means the orthogonal direction.

Table 1 Radiometric characteristics of the Microwave Sounding Unit

Channel Number	Frequency (GHz)	Polarization near nadir	Radiometric Resolution NEDT (K)	Primary Function
1	50.30	vertical	0.3	Surface Emissivity, Precipitation
2	53.74	horizontal	0.3	Mid-troposphere Temperature
3	54.96	vertical	0.3	Temperature Near Tropopause
4	57.95	horizontal	0.3	Lower-stratosphere Temperature

== Applications ==
The MSU was used by NOAA for meteorological analyses in combination with two infrared instruments, and sometimes alone, for post-analysis of weather events and other atmospheric phenomena such as waves. MSU and AMSU together provide a long data record and have been used for tracking atmospheric temperature trends (see: Microwave Sounding Unit temperature measurements).

== See also ==
- MSU temperature measurements
- Satellite temperature measurements
