= Journal of Atmospheric and Oceanic Technology =

Scientific publication by the American Meteorological Society

- Discipline: Atmospheric sciences and Physical oceanography
- Language: English
- Edited by: Luca Baldini, Javier Fochesatto

Publication details
- History: 1984–present
- Publisher: American Meteorological Society (U.S.A)
- Frequency: Monthly
- Open access: Delayed, 1 year
- Impact factor: 2.075 (2020)

Standard abbreviations
- ISO 4: J. Atmos. Ocean. Technol.

Indexing
- ISSN: 0739-0572 (print); 1520-0426 (web)

Links
- Journal homepage; Archive

The Journal of Atmospheric and Oceanic Technology is a scientific publication by the American Meteorological Society. The journal includes papers describing the instrumentation and methodology used in atmospheric and oceanic research including computational techniques, methods for data acquisition, processing, and interpretation, and information systems and algorithms.

== See also ==
- List of scientific journals
  - List of scientific journals in earth and atmospheric sciences
