= Roy Spencer (meteorologist) =

American meteorologist (born 1955)

Roy W. Spencer
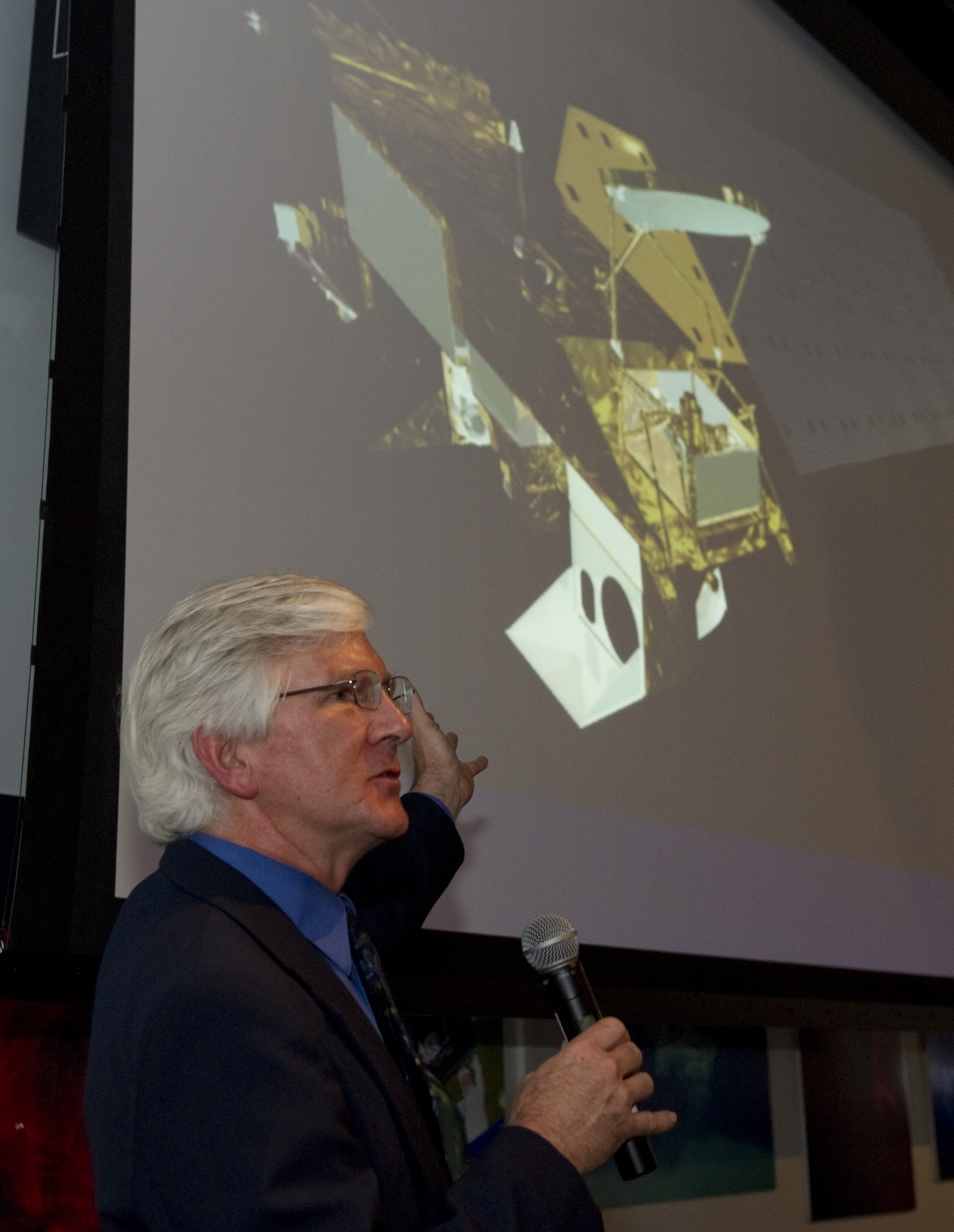
- Born: December 20, 1955 (age 70); United States
- Education: University of Michigan (BS); University of Wisconsin–Madison (MS, PhD)
- Awards: NASA Exceptional Scientific Achievement Medal (1991), AMS Special Award (1996)
- Scientific career
- Fields: Meteorology
- Workplaces: NASA, University of Alabama in Huntsville
- Thesis: A case study of African wave structure and energetics during Atlantic transit (1981)
- Doctoral advisor: Verner E. Suomi
- Website: Official website

Roy Warren Spencer (born December 20, 1955) is an American meteorologist and climate scientist. He is a principal research scientist at the University of Alabama in Huntsville, and the U.S. Science Team leader for the Advanced Microwave Scanning Radiometer (AMSR-E) on NASA's Aqua satellite. He has served as senior scientist for climate studies at NASA's Marshall Space Flight Center. He is known for his satellite-based temperature monitoring work, for which he was awarded the American Meteorological Society's Special Award. Regarding climate change, Spencer is a "lukewarmer", with the view that anthropogenic greenhouse gas emissions have caused some warming, but that influence is small compared to natural variations in global average cloud cover. He has written several books regarding, in his words, "hysteria" about climate change, which he says hurts both science and the people.

== Education and career ==
Spencer received a BS in atmospheric sciences from the University of Michigan in 1978 and his MS and PhD in meteorology from the University of Wisconsin–Madison in 1980 and 1982. His doctoral thesis was titled, A case study of African wave structure and energetics during Atlantic transit.

After receiving his PhD in 1982, Spencer worked for two years as a research scientist in the Space Science and Engineering Center at the University of Wisconsin–Madison. He then joined NASA's Marshall Space Flight Center as a visiting scientist in 1984, where he later became senior scientist for climate studies. After leaving NASA in 2001, Spencer has been a principal research scientist at the University of Alabama in Huntsville (UAH). As well as his position at UAH, Spencer is currently the U.S. Science Team leader for the Advanced Microwave Scanning Radiometer (AMSR-E) on NASA's Aqua satellite, a position he has held since 1994.

In 2001, he designed an algorithm to detect tropical cyclones and estimate their maximum sustained wind speed using the Advanced Microwave Sounding Unit (AMSU).

Spencer has been a member of several science teams: the Tropical Rainfall Measuring Mission (TRMM) Space Station Accommodations Analysis Study Team, Science Steering Group for TRMM, TOVS Pathfinder Working Group, NASA Headquarters Earth Science and Applications Advisory Subcommittee, and two National Research Council (NRC) study panels. He is on the board of directors of the George C. Marshall Institute, and on the board of advisors of the Cornwall Alliance for the Stewardship of Creation.

Spencer's research work is funded by NASA, NOAA, DOE, and the DOT. He also received money from Peabody Energy.

== Peer-reviewed articles on climate change ==
=== Negative cloud feedback ===
In 2007, Spencer and others published a paper in Geophysical Research Letters regarding negative cloud feedback in the tropics that potentially supports Richard Lindzen's Iris hypothesis, which proposes that as the tropical atmosphere warms, cirrus clouds decrease, allowing infrared heat to escape from the atmosphere to outer space. Spencer stated, "To give an idea of how strong this enhanced cooling mechanism is, if it was operating on global warming, it would reduce estimates of future warming by over 75 percent. [...] Right now, all climate models predict that clouds will amplify warming. I'm betting that if the climate models' 'clouds' were made to behave the way we see these clouds behave in nature, it would substantially reduce the amount of climate change the models predict for the coming decades."

=== Cloud formation and temperature change ===
In 2008, Spencer and William Braswell published a paper in the Journal of Climate which suggests that natural variations in how clouds form could actually be causing temperature changes, rather than the other way around, and could also lead to overestimates of how sensitive the Earth's climate is to greenhouse gas emissions. Spencer stated, "Our paper is an important step toward validating a gut instinct that many meteorologists like myself have had over the years, [...] that the climate system is dominated by stabilizing processes, rather than destabilizing processes – that is, negative feedback rather than positive feedback."

=== Energy lost to space as compared to climate models ===
In 2011, Spencer and Braswell published a paper in Remote Sensing concluding that more energy is radiated back to space and released earlier than previously thought. Spencer stated, "The satellite observations suggest there is much more energy lost to space during and after warming than the climate models show. There is a huge discrepancy between the data and the forecasts that is especially big over the oceans."

The paper was criticized by climate scientists. Kerry Emanuel of MIT, said this work was cautious and limited mostly to pointing out problems with forecasting heat feedback, and that the interpretations of the study by non-scientists have "no basis in reality."

The editor-in-chief of Remote Sensing, Wolfgang Wagner, later resigned over publication of Spencer and Braswell (2011), stating, "From a purely formal point of view, there were no errors with the review process. [...] the problem I see with the paper by Spencer and Braswell is not that it declared a minority view ...but that it essentially ignored the scientific arguments of its opponents. This latter point was missed in the review process, explaining why I perceive this paper to be fundamentally flawed and therefore wrongly accepted by the journal." Wagner added he, "would also like to personally protest against how the authors and like-minded climate skeptics have much exaggerated the paper's conclusions in public statements".

Andrew Dessler later published a paper opposing the claims of Spencer and Braswell (2011) in Geophysical Research Letters. He stated, among other things:

First, [they] analyzed 14 models, but they plotted only six models and the particular observational data set that provided maximum support for their hypothesis. Plotting all of the models and all of the data provide a much different conclusion.

== Views ==
=== Climate change ===
Spencer has published two books on climate change: In 2008, Climate Confusion: How Global Warming Hysteria Leads to Bad Science, Pandering Politicians and Misguided Policies that Hurt the Poor, and in 2010, The Great Global Warming Blunder: How Mother Nature Fooled the World's Top Climate Scientists.

He believes that most climate change is natural in origin, the result of long-term changes in the Earth's albedo and that anthropogenic greenhouse gas emissions have caused some warming, but that its warming influence is small compared to natural, internal, chaotic fluctuations in global average cloud cover. At that time the IPCC held the view that "Most of the observed increase in global average temperatures since the mid-20th century is very likely due to the observed increase in anthropogenic GHG concentrations".

In a February 2014 blog post, Spencer announced that he would push back against the label "climate change denier," applied to him and others questioning mainstream climate views, by referring to his critics as "global warming Nazis." He contended that "...these people are supporting policies that will kill far more people than the Nazis ever did." The Anti-Defamation League responded with a statement condemning Spencer's comparison. Shelley Rose, the ADL's Southeast Interim Regional Director, argued that the comparison of global warming advocates to Nazis was "outrageous and deeply offensive," and "This analogy is just the latest example of a troubling epidemic of comparisons to Hitler and the Holocaust."

In 2025, Spencer co-authored "A Critical Review of Impacts of Greenhouse Gas Emissions on the U.S. Climate", which is a report written for the U.S. Energy Secretary Christopher Wright.

=== Intelligent design ===
Spencer believes in the pseudoscience of intelligent design which was criticized by Phil Plait, in Slate as advocating "warmed-over creationism". Spencer's views on the matter were used as an example in an exploration by the Christian Science Monitor as a possible connection between climate change denial and creationism.

== Awards ==
- 1989 – Marshall Space Flight Center Center Director's Commendation
- 1990 – Alabama House of Representatives Resolution #624
- 1991 – NASA Exceptional Scientific Achievement Medal (with John Christy)
- 1996 – American Meteorological Society Special Award "for developing a global, precise record of earth's temperature from operational polar-orbiting satellites, fundamentally advancing our ability to monitor climate." (with John Christy)

== See also ==
- John Christy (satellite temperature record)
- UAH satellite temperature dataset

== Selected publications ==
=== Articles ===
- Spencer, Roy W. (June 30, 2006). "Star Search". TCS Daily. Archived from the original on August 7, 2011.
- Spencer, Roy W. (January 16, 2005). "World warms to Kyoto, but research will save the day". USA Today.
- Spencer, Roy W. (February 26, 2007). "Not That Simple – Global Warming: What We Don't Know". New York Post.
- Spencer, Roy W. (May 1, 2008). "More Carbon Dioxide, Please". National Review.

=== Books ===
- Spencer, Roy W. (2008). Climate Confusion: How Global Warming Hysteria Leads to Bad Science, Pandering Politicians and Misguided Policies that Hurt the Poor. Encounter Books. ISBN 978-1-59403-210-3.
- Spencer, Roy W. (2010). The Great Global Warming Blunder: How Mother Nature Fooled the World's Top Climate Scientists. Encounter Books. ISBN 978-1-59403-373-5.
- Spencer, Roy W. (2010). The Bad Science and Bad Policy of Obama's Global Warming Agenda. Encounter Books. ISBN 978-1-59403-482-4. Archived from the original on July 18, 2012.
- Spencer, Roy W. (2011). Fundanomics: The Free Market, Simplified. Amazon. ASIN B005C626NG.

=== Peer-reviewed papers ===
- Spencer, Roy W.; Christy, John R. (1990). "Precise Monitoring of Global Temperature Trends from Satellites". Science. 247 (4950): 1558–1562. Bibcode:1990Sci...247.1558S. doi:10.1126/science.247.4950.1558. PMID 17782811. S2CID 22244815.
- Spencer, Roy W.; Braswell, William D. (2007). "Cloud and radiation budget changes associated with tropical intraseasonal oscillations". Geophysical Research Letters. 34 (15): L15707. Bibcode:2007GeoRL..3415707S. doi:10.1029/2007GL029698.
- Spencer, Roy W.; Braswell, William D. (2008). "Potential Biases in Feedback Diagnosis from Observational Data: A Simple Model Demonstration". Journal of Climate. 21 (21): 5624–5628. Bibcode:2008JCli...21.5624S. doi:10.1175/2008JCLI2253.1.
- Spencer, Roy W.; Braswell, William D. (2010). "On the diagnosis of radiative feedback in the presence of unknown radiative forcing". Journal of Geophysical Research. 115 (D16): D16109. Bibcode:2010JGRD..11516109S. doi:10.1029/2009JD013371.
- Spencer, Roy W.; Braswell, William D. (2011). "On the Misdiagnosis of Surface Temperature Feedbacks from Variations in Earth's Radiant Energy Balance". Remote Sensing. 3 (8): 1603–1613. Bibcode:2011RemS....3.1603S. doi:10.3390/rs3081603.

In 2025, with John Christy, Judith Curry, Steven E. Koonin, and Ross McKitrick, Spencer was a member of the United States Department of Energy's Climate Working Group and a co-author of its A Critical Review of Impacts of Greenhouse Gas Emissions on the US Climate (23 July 2025)
