= UAH satellite temperature dataset =

Atmospheric layer temp deduced from oxygen radiance

The UAH satellite temperature dataset, developed at the University of Alabama in Huntsville, infers the temperature of various atmospheric layers from satellite measurements of the oxygen radiance in the microwave band, using Microwave Sounding Unit temperature measurements.

It was the first global temperature datasets developed from satellite information and has been used as a tool for research into surface and atmospheric temperature changes. The dataset is published by John Christy et al. and formerly jointly with Roy Spencer.

== Satellite temperature measurements ==
Satellites do not measure temperature directly. They measure radiances in various wavelength bands, from which temperature may be inferred. The resulting temperature profiles depend on details of the methods that are used to obtain temperatures from radiances. As a result, different groups that have analyzed the satellite data have obtained different temperature data (see Microwave Sounding Unit temperature measurements). Among these groups are Remote Sensing Systems (RSS) and the University of Alabama in Huntsville (UAH). The satellite series is not fully homogeneous - it is constructed from a series of satellites starting with the 1978 TIROS-N, where different satellites had similar but not identical instrumentation. The sensors deteriorate over time, and corrections are necessary for satellite drift and orbital decay. Particularly large differences between reconstructed temperature series occur at the few times when there is little temporal overlap between successive satellites, making intercalibration difficult.

== Description of the data ==
The UAH dataset is produced by one of the groups reconstructing temperature from radiance.

UAH provide data on three broad levels of the atmosphere.

- The Lower troposphere - TLT (originally called T2LT).
- The mid troposphere - TMT
- The lower stratosphere - TLS

Data are provided as temperature anomalies against the seasonal average over a past basis period, as well as in absolute temperature values. The baseline period for the published temperature anomalies was changed in January 2021 from 1981-2010 to 1991-2020.

All the data products can be downloaded from the UAH server.

=== Recent trend summary ===
To compare to the trend from the surface temperature record (+0.161±0.033 °C/decade from 1979 to 2012 according to NASA GISS) it is most appropriate to derive trends for the part of the atmosphere nearest the surface, i.e., the lower troposphere. Doing this, through December 2019, the UAH linear temperature trend 1979-2019 shows a warming of +0.13 °C/decade.

For comparison, a different group, Remote Sensing Systems (RSS), also analyzes the MSU data. From their data: the RSS linear temperature trend shows a warming of +0.208 °C/decade.

=== Geographic coverage ===
Data are available as global, hemispheric, zonal, and gridded averages. The global average covers 97-98% of Earth's surface, excluding only latitudes above +85 degrees, below -85 degrees and, in the cases of TLT and TMT, some areas with land above 1500 m altitude. The hemispheric averages are over the northern and southern hemispheres 0 to +/-85 degrees. The gridded data provide an almost global temperature map. However, other sources state that the globally averaged trends are computed over latitudes from 82.5S to 82.5N (70S to 82.5N for channel TLT).

=== Temporal coverage ===
Daily global, hemispheric and zonal data are available. Monthly averages are available in gridded format as well as by hemisphere and globally.

Each set has data back to December 1978.

== Comparison with other data and models ==
In comparing these measurements to surface temperature models, values for the lower troposphere measurements taken by the MSU are a weighted average of temperatures over multiple altitudes (roughly 0 to 12 km), and not a surface temperature (see figure in Microwave Sounding Unit temperature measurements article). The results are thus not precisely comparable to surface temperature records or models.

Pre-1998 results published by UAH showed no warming of the atmosphere. In a 1998 paper, Wentz and Schabel showed this (along with other discrepancies) was due to the orbital decay of the NOAA satellites. With these errors corrected, the UAH data showed a 0.07 °C/decade increase in lower troposphere temperature.

Some discrepancies between the UAH temperature measurements and temperatures measured by other groups remain, with (as of 2019) the lower troposphere temperature trend from 1979-2019 calculated as +0.13 °C/decade by UAH, and calculated at +0.208 °C/decade by RSS.

A more detailed discussion can be found in the Comparison with surface trends section of the Microwave Sounding Unit temperature measurements article.

== Corrections made ==
The table below summarizes the adjustments that have been applied to the UAH TLT dataset. The 'trend correction' refers to the change in global mean decadal temperature trend in degrees Celsius/decade as a result of the correction.

UAH version	Main adjustment	Trend correction	Year
A	Simple bias correction		1992
B	Linear diurnal drift correction	-0.03	1994
C	Removal of residual annual cycle related to hot target variation	0.03	1997
D	Orbital decay	0.10	1998
D	Removal of dependence of time variations of hot target temperature	-0.07	1998
5.0	Non-linear diurnal correction	0.008	2003
5.1	Tightened criteria for data acceptance	-0.004	2004
5.2	Correction of diurnal drift adjustment	0.035	2005
5.3	Annual cycle correction	0	2009
5.4	New annual cycle	0	2010
6.0 beta	Extensive revision	-0.026	2015

NOAA-11 played a significant role in a 2005 study by Mears et al. identifying an error in the diurnal correction that leads to the 40% jump in Spencer and Christy's trend from version 5.1 to 5.2.

Christy et al. asserted in a 2007 paper that the tropical temperature trends from radiosondes matches more closely with their v5.2 UAH-TLT dataset than with RSS v2.1.

Much of the difference, at least in the Lower troposphere global average decadal trend between UAH and RSS, had been removed with the release of RSS version 3.3 in January 2011, at which time the RSS and UAH TLT were now within 0.003 K/decade of one another. Significant differences remained, however, in the Mid Troposphere (TMT) decadal trends. However, in June 2017 RSS released version 4 which significantly increased the trend from 0.136 to 0.184 K/decade substantially increasing the difference again.

A beta version of 6.0 of the dataset was released on April 28, 2015 via blog post. This dataset has higher spatial resolution and uses new methods for gridpoint averaging.
