= Atmospheric infrared sounder =

Science instrument on NASA's Aqua satellite

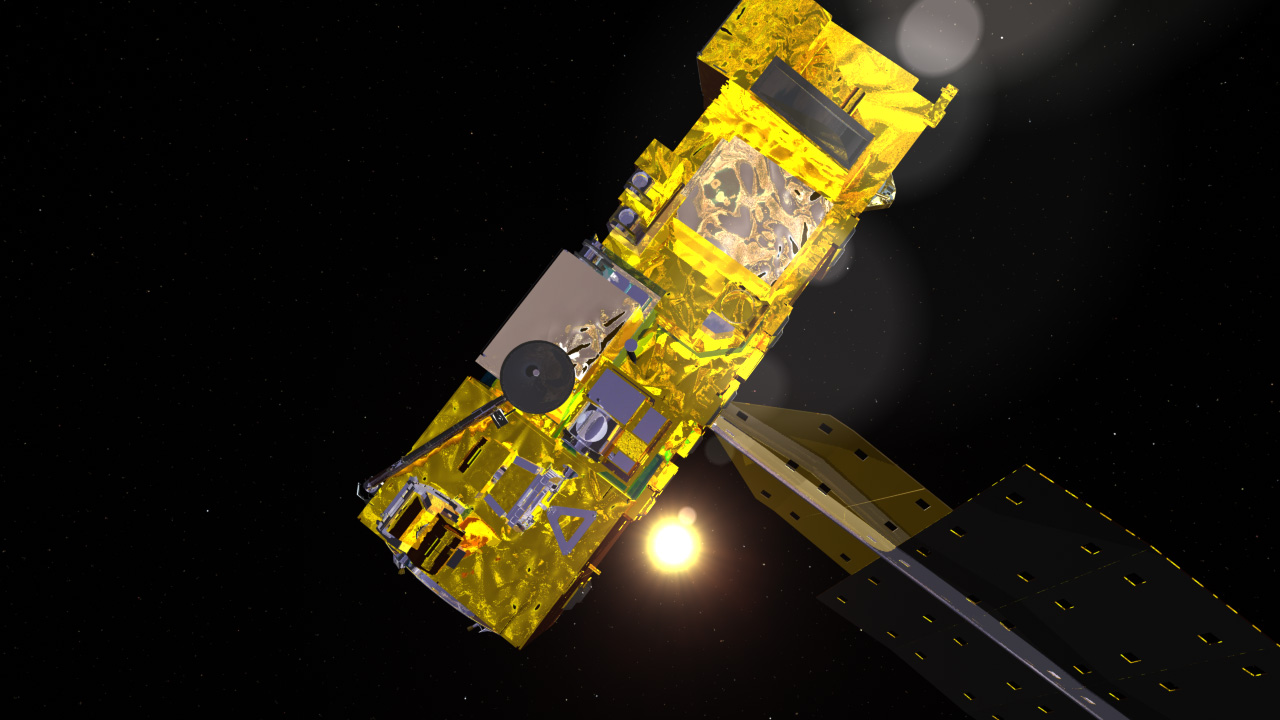
The AIRS instrument flies on NASA's Aqua satellite.

The atmospheric infrared sounder (AIRS) is one of six instruments flying on board NASA's Aqua satellite, launched on May 4, 2002. The instrument is designed to support climate research and improve weather forecasting.

Working in combination with its partner microwave instrument, the Advanced Microwave Sounding Unit (AMSU-A), AIRS observes the global water and energy cycles, climate variation and trends, and the response of the climate system to increased greenhouse gases. AIRS uses infrared technology to create three-dimensional maps of air and surface temperature, water vapor, and cloud properties. AIRS can also measure trace greenhouse gases such as ozone, carbon monoxide, carbon dioxide, and methane.

AIRS and AMSU-A share the Aqua satellite with the Moderate Resolution Imaging Spectroradiometer (MODIS), Clouds and the Earth's Radiant Energy System (CERES), and the Advanced Microwave Scanning Radiometer-EOS (AMSR-E). Aqua is part of NASA's "A-train," a series of high-inclination, Sun-synchronous satellites in low Earth orbit designed to make long-term global observations of the land surface, biosphere, solid Earth, atmosphere, and ocean.

AIRS data are free and available to the public through the Goddard Earth Sciences Data Information and Services Center. NASA's Jet Propulsion Laboratory in Pasadena, California, manages AIRS for NASA's Science Mission Directorate in Washington, D.C.

== Technology ==
The term "sounder" in AIRS's name refers to the fact that the instrument measures temperature and water vapor as a function of height (atmospheric sounding).

AIRS measures the infrared brightness coming up from Earth's surface and from the atmosphere. Its scan mirror rotates around an axis along the line of flight and directs infrared energy from the Earth into the instrument. As the spacecraft moves along, this mirror sweeps the ground creating a scan swath that extends roughly 800 kilometers on either side of the ground track. Within the instrument, an advanced, high-resolution spectrometer separates the infrared energy into wavelengths.

Each infrared wavelength is sensitive to temperature and water vapor over a range of heights in the atmosphere, from the surface up into the stratosphere. By having multiple infrared detectors, each sensing a particular wavelength, a temperature profile, or sounding of the atmosphere, can be made. While prior space instruments had only 15 detectors, AIRS has 2378. This greatly improves the accuracy, making it comparable to measurements made by weather balloons.

Thick clouds act like a wall to the infrared energy measured by AIRS. However, microwave instruments on board Aqua can see through the clouds with limited accuracy. Using a special computer algorithm, data from AIRS and the microwave instruments are combined to provide highly accurate measurements in all cloud conditions resulting in a daily global snapshot of the state of the atmosphere.

== AIRS Science and Applications ==
AIRS and its companion microwave sounder AMSU observe the entire atmospheric column from Earth's surface to the top of the atmosphere. The primary data they return is the infrared spectrum in 2378 individual frequencies. The infrared spectrum is rich in information on numerous gases in the atmosphere.

AIRS primary scientific achievement has been to improve weather prediction and provide new information on the water and energy cycle. The instrument also yields information on several important greenhouse gases.

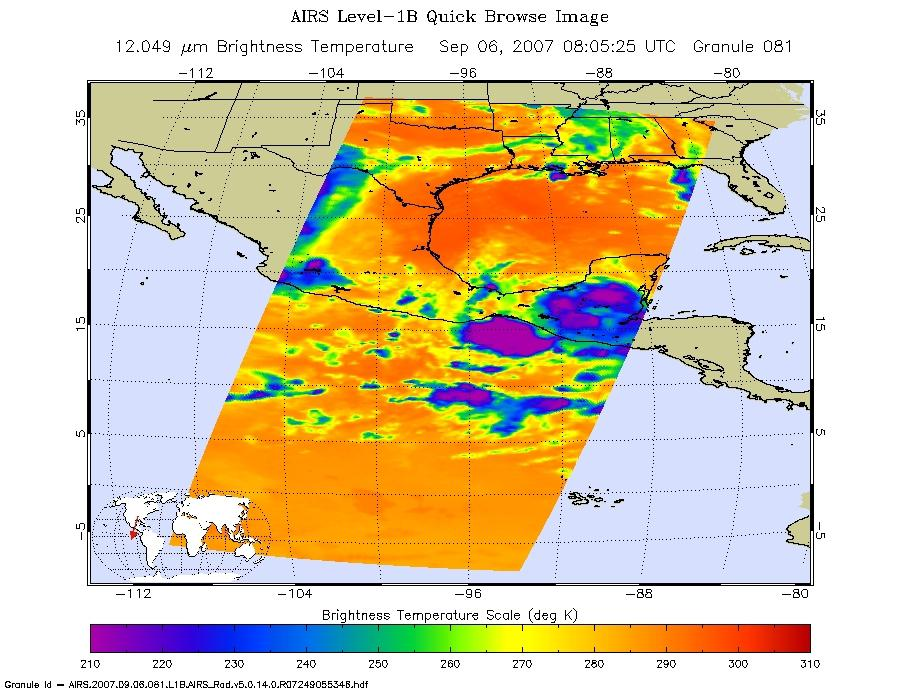
This infrared image from AIRS shows the remnants of Hurricane Felix in September 2007.

Weather and climate forecasting

AIRS data are used by weather forecasting centers around the world. By incorporating AIRS measurements into their models, forecasters have been able to extend reliable mid-range weather forecasts by more than six hours. AIRS data have also improved forecasts of the location and magnitude of predicted storms.

AIRS temperature and water vapor profiles are available in real time to regional weather forecasters, providing twice-daily weather measurements for the entire Pacific Ocean, once in the morning and once in the evening.

AIRS measurements form a "fingerprint" of the state of the atmosphere for a given time and place that can be used as a climate data record for future generations. They have become important tools for understanding current climate and increasing the ability to predict the future.

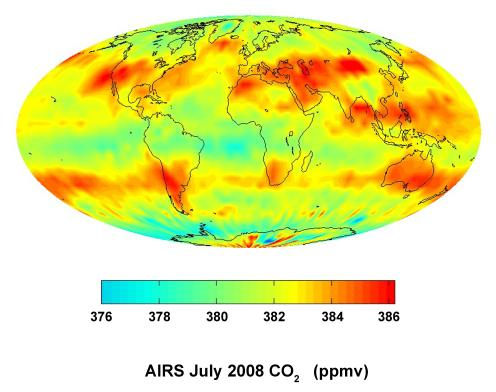
AIRS maps the distribution of carbon dioxide in the atmosphere.

Atmospheric Composition, Greenhouse Gases, and Air Quality

AIRS maps the concentration of carbon dioxide and methane globally. Its ability to provide simultaneous observations of the Earth's atmospheric temperature, water vapor, ocean surface temperature, and land surface temperature and infrared spectral emissivity, as well as humidity, clouds and the distribution of greenhouse gases, makes AIRS/AMSU a very useful space instrument to observe and study the response of the atmosphere to increased greenhouse gases.

The instrument can detect carbon monoxide emissions from the burning of plant materials and animal waste by humans in rainforests and large cities. It can follow giant plumes of this gas moving across the planet from these large burns, allowing scientists to better monitor pollution transport patterns.

AIRS provides a global daily 3-D view of Earth's ozone layer, showing how ozone is transported. The instrument also gives scientists their best view of atmospheric ozone in the Antarctic region during the polar winter.

AIRS is also able to identify concentrations of sulphur dioxide and dust.
