= Satellite temperature measurement =

Type of Earth observation from space

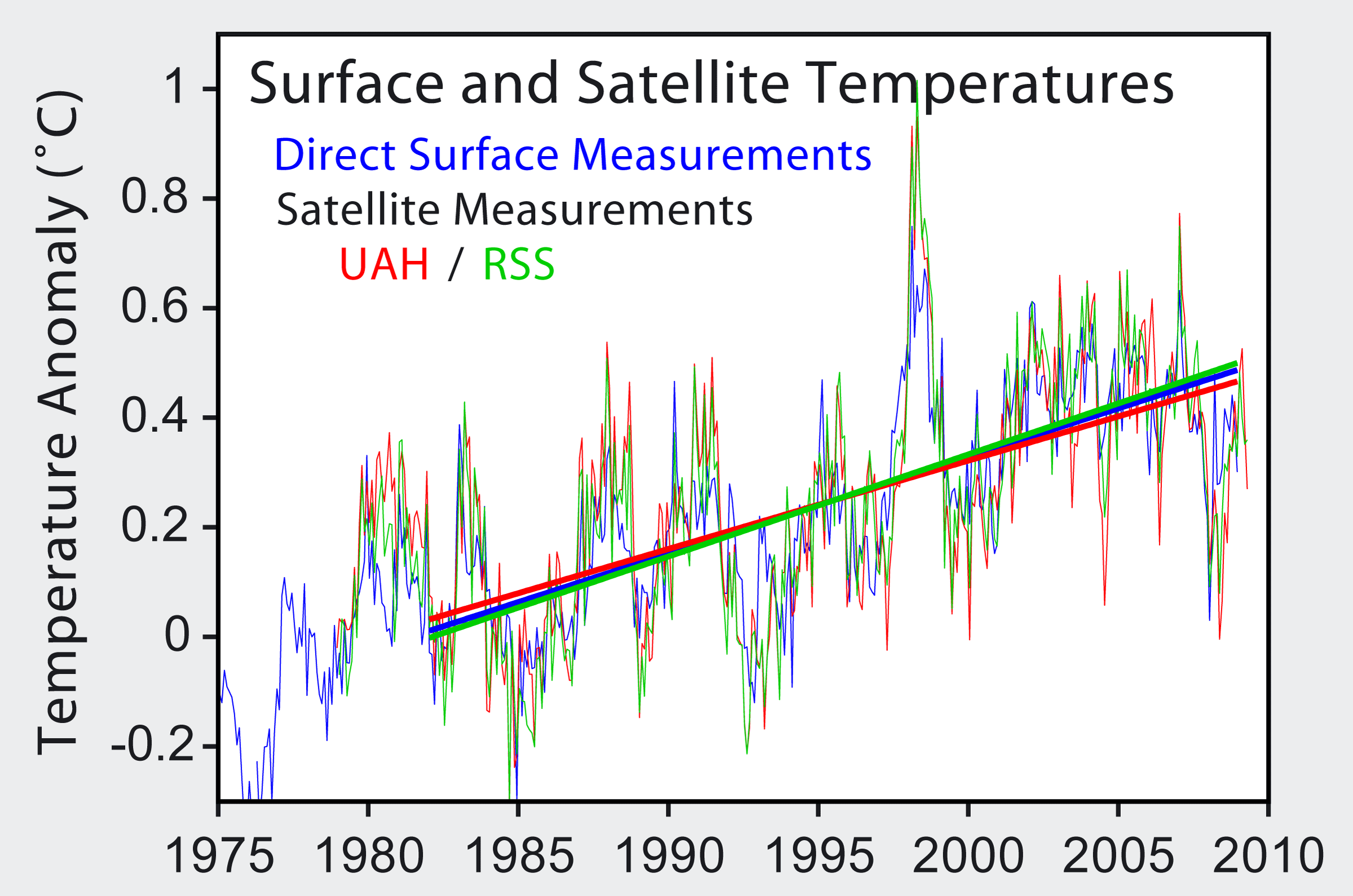
Comparison of ground-based measurements of near-surface temperature (blue) and satellite based records of mid-tropospheric temperature (red: UAH; green: RSS) from 1979 to 2010. Trends plotted 1982-2010.

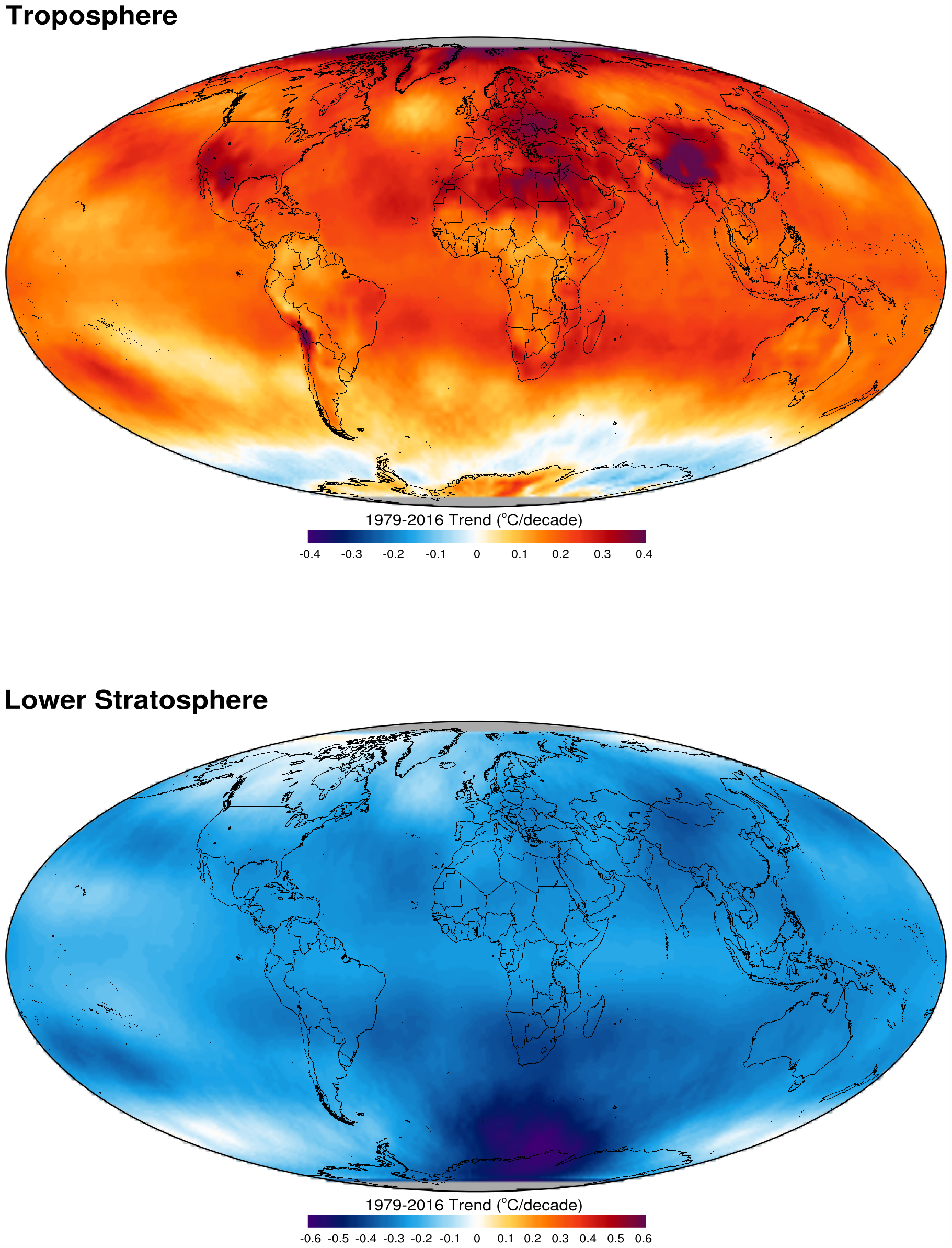
Atmospheric temperature trends from 1979-2016 based on satellite measurements; troposphere above, stratosphere below.

Satellite temperature measurements are inferences of the temperature of the atmosphere at various altitudes as well as sea and land surface temperatures obtained from radiometric measurements by satellites. These measurements can be used to locate weather fronts, monitor the El Niño-Southern Oscillation, determine the strength of tropical cyclones, study urban heat islands and monitor the global climate. Wildfires, volcanos, and industrial hot spots can also be found via thermal imaging from weather satellites.

Weather satellites do not measure temperature directly. They measure radiances in various wavelength bands. Since 1978 microwave sounding units (MSUs) on National Oceanic and Atmospheric Administration polar orbiting satellites have measured the intensity of upwelling microwave radiation from atmospheric oxygen, which is related to the temperature of broad vertical layers of the atmosphere. Measurements of infrared radiation pertaining to sea surface temperature have been collected since 1967.

Satellite datasets show that over the past four decades the troposphere has warmed and the stratosphere has cooled. Both of these trends are consistent with the influence of increasing atmospheric concentrations of greenhouse gases.

== Principles ==
Satellites measure radiances in various wavelength bands, which must then be mathematically inverted to obtain indirect inferences of temperature. The resulting temperature profiles depend on details of the methods that are used to obtain temperatures from radiances. As a result, different groups that have analyzed the satellite data have produced differing temperature datasets.

The satellite time series is not homogeneous. It is constructed from a series of satellites with similar but not identical sensors. The sensors also deteriorate over time, and corrections are necessary for orbital drift and decay. Particularly large differences between reconstructed temperature series occur at the few times when there is little temporal overlap between successive satellites, making intercalibration difficult.

== Infrared measurements ==
=== Surface measurements ===
Land surface temperature anomalies for a given month compared to the long-term average temperature of that month between 2000-2008.

Sea surface temperature anomalies for a given month compared to the long-term average temperature of that month from 1985 through 1997.

Infrared radiation can be used to measure both the temperature of the surface (using "window" wavelengths to which the atmosphere is transparent), and the temperature of the atmosphere (using wavelengths for which the atmosphere is not transparent, or measuring cloud top temperatures in infrared windows).

Satellites used to retrieve surface temperatures via measurement of thermal infrared in general require cloud-free conditions. Some of the instruments include the Advanced Very High Resolution Radiometer (AVHRR), Along Track Scanning Radiometers (AASTR), Visible Infrared Imaging Radiometer Suite (VIIRS), the Atmospheric Infrared Sounder (AIRS), and the ACE Fourier Transform Spectrometer (ACE‐FTS) on the Canadian SCISAT-1 satellite.

Weather satellites have been available to infer sea surface temperature (SST) information since 1967, with the first global composites occurring during 1970. Since 1982, satellites have been increasingly utilized to measure SST and have allowed its spatial and temporal variation to be viewed more fully. For example, changes in SST monitored via satellite have been used to document the progression of the El Niño-Southern Oscillation since the 1970s.

Over land the retrieval of temperature from radiances is harder, because of inhomogeneities in the surface. Studies have been conducted on the urban heat island effect via satellite imagery. By using the fractal technique, Weng, Q. et al. characterized the spatial pattern of urban heat island. Use of advanced very high resolution infrared satellite imagery can be used, in the absence of cloudiness, to detect density discontinuities (weather fronts) such as cold fronts at ground level. Using the Dvorak technique, infrared satellite imagery can be used to determine the temperature difference between the eye and the cloud top temperature of the central dense overcast of mature tropical cyclones to estimate their maximum sustained winds and their minimum central pressures.

Along Track Scanning Radiometers aboard weather satellites are able to detect wildfires, which show up at night as pixels with a greater temperature than 308 K (35 °C; 95 °F). The Moderate-Resolution Imaging Spectroradiometer aboard the Terra satellite can detect thermal hot spots associated with wildfires, volcanoes, and industrial hot spots.

The Atmospheric Infrared Sounder on the Aqua satellite, launched in 2002, uses infrared detection to measure near-surface temperature.

=== Stratosphere measurements ===
Stratospheric temperature measurements are made from the Stratospheric Sounding Unit (SSU) instruments, which are three-channel infrared (IR) radiometers. Since this measures infrared emission from carbon dioxide, the atmospheric opacity is higher and hence the temperature is measured at a higher altitude (stratosphere) than microwave measurements.

Since 1979 the Stratospheric sounding units (SSUs) on the NOAA operational satellites have provided near global stratospheric temperature data above the lower stratosphere. The SSU is a far-infrared spectrometer employing a pressure modulation technique to make measurement in three channels in the 15 μm carbon dioxide absorption band. The three channels use the same frequency but different carbon dioxide cell pressure, the corresponding weighting functions peaks at 29 km for channel 1, 37 km for channel 2 and 45 km for channel 3.

The process of deriving trends from SSUs measurement has proved particularly difficult because of satellite drift, inter-calibration between different satellites with scant overlap and gas leaks in the instrument carbon dioxide pressure cells. Furthermore, since the radiances measured by SSUs are due to emission by carbon dioxide the weighting functions move to higher altitudes as the carbon dioxide concentration in the stratosphere increase. Mid to upper stratosphere temperatures shows a strong negative trend interspersed by transient volcanic warming after the explosive volcanic eruptions of El Chichón and Mount Pinatubo, little temperature trend has been observed since 1995. The greatest cooling occurred in the tropical stratosphere consistent with enhanced Brewer-Dobson circulation under greenhouse gas concentrations increase.

Lower stratospheric cooling is mainly caused by the effects of ozone depletion with a possible contribution from increased stratospheric water vapor and greenhouse gases increase. There has been a decline in stratospheric temperatures, interspersed by warmings related to volcanic eruptions. Global Warming theory suggests that the stratosphere should cool while the troposphere warms.

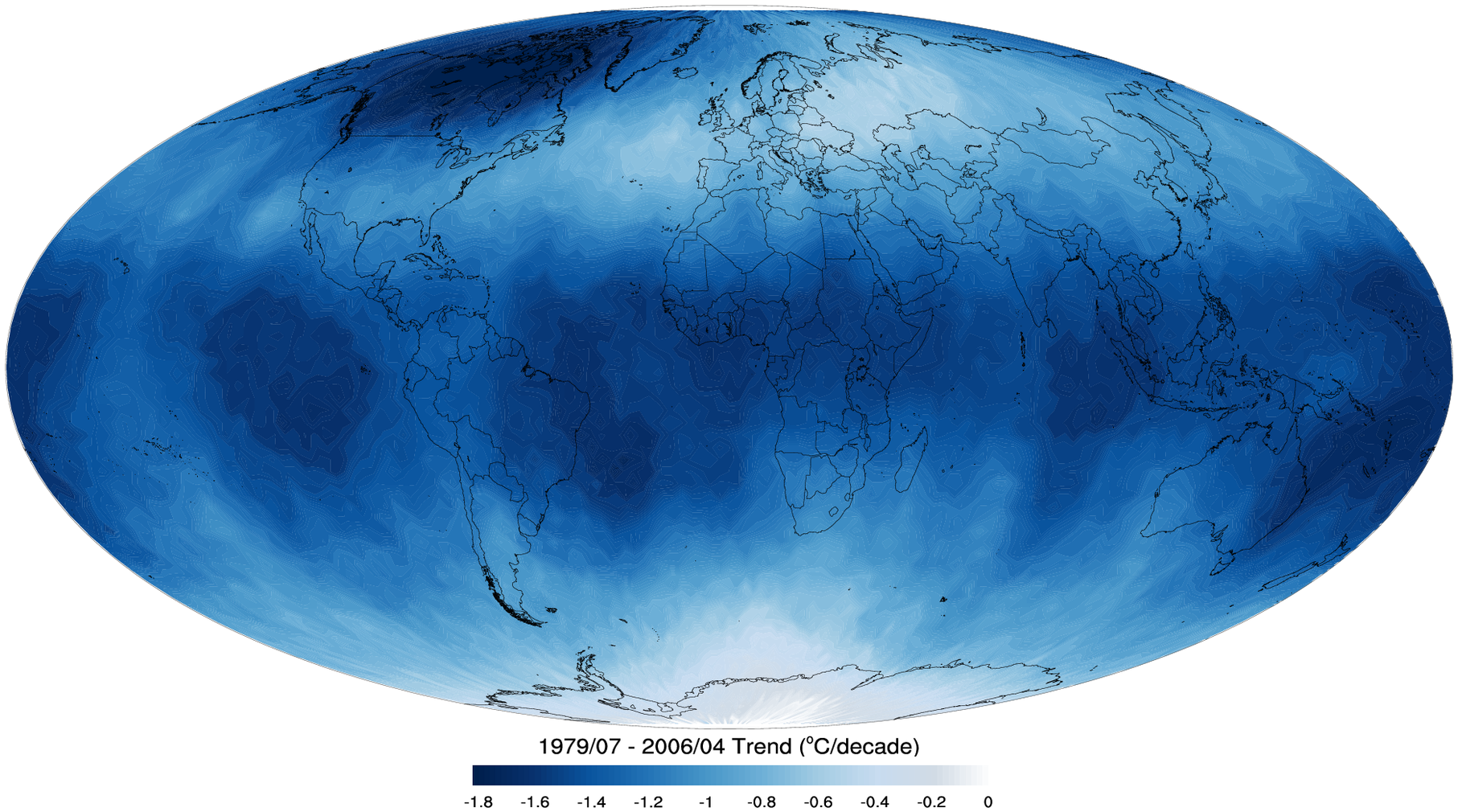
Top of the stratosphere (TTS) 1979–2006 temperature trend.

The long term cooling in the lower stratosphere occurred in two downward steps in temperature both after the transient warming related to explosive volcanic eruptions of El Chichón and Mount Pinatubo, this behavior of the global stratospheric temperature has been attributed to global ozone concentration variation in the two years following volcanic eruptions.

Since 1996 the trend is slightly positive due to ozone recovery juxtaposed to a cooling trend of 0.1K/decade that is consistent with the predicted impact of increased greenhouse gases.

The table below shows the stratospheric temperature trend from the SSU measurements in the three different bands, where negative trend indicated cooling.

| Channel | Start | End date | STAR v3.0 Global Trend (K/decade) |
|---|---|---|---|
| TMS | 1978-11 | 2017-01 | −0.583 |
| TUS | 1978-11 | 2017-01 | −0.649 |
| TTS | 1979-07 | 2017-01 | −0.728 |

== Microwave (tropospheric and stratospheric) measurements ==
=== Microwave Sounding Unit (MSU) measurements ===
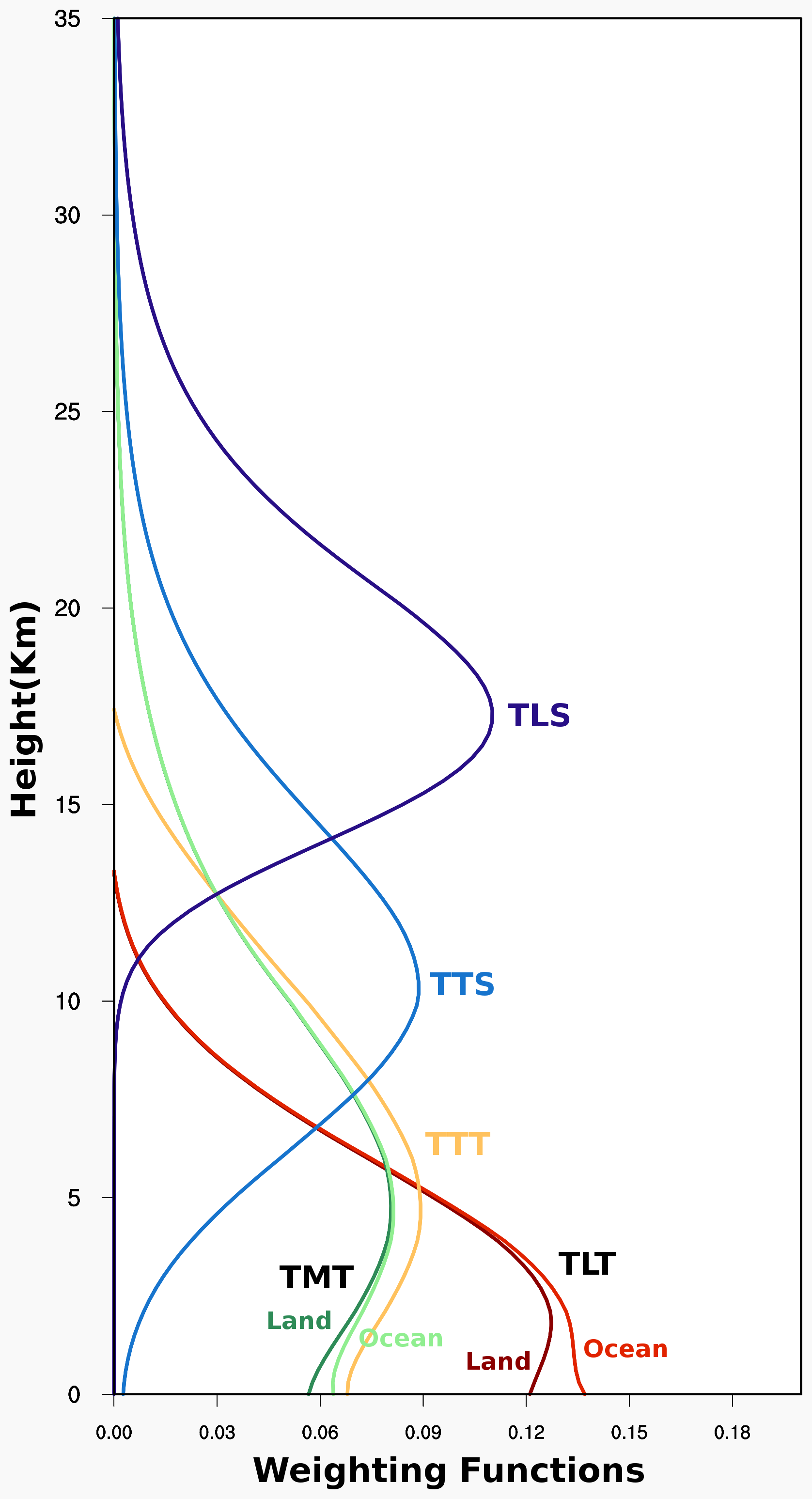
MSU weighting functions based upon the U.S. Standard Atmosphere.

From 1979 to 2005 the microwave sounding units (MSUs) and since 1998 the Advanced Microwave Sounding Units on NOAA polar orbiting weather satellites have measured the intensity of upwelling microwave radiation from atmospheric oxygen. The intensity is proportional to the temperature of broad vertical layers of the atmosphere. Upwelling radiance is measured at different frequencies; these different frequency bands sample a different weighted range of the atmosphere.

Figure 3 (right) shows the atmospheric levels sampled by different wavelength reconstructions from the satellite measurements, where TLS, TTS, and TTT represent three different wavelengths.

=== Other microwave measurements ===
A different technique is used by the Aura spacecraft, the Microwave Limb Sounder, which measure microwave emission horizontally, rather than aiming at the nadir.

Temperature measurements are also made by GPS radio occultation. This technique measures the refraction of the radio waves transmitted by GPS satellites as they propagate in the Earth's atmosphere, thus allowing vertical temperature and moisture profiles to be measured.

== Temperature measurements on other planets ==
Planetary science missions also make temperature measurements on other planets and moons of the Solar System, using both infrared techniques (typical of orbiter and flyby missions of planets with solid surfaces) and microwave techniques (more often used for planets with atmospheres). Infrared temperature measurement instruments used in planetary missions include surface temperature measurements taken by the Thermal Emission Spectrometer (TES) instrument on Mars Global Surveyor and the Diviner instrument on the Lunar Reconnaissance Orbiter; and atmospheric temperature measurements taken by the composite infrared spectrometer instrument on the NASA Cassini spacecraft.

Microwave atmospheric temperature measurement instruments include the Microwave Radiometer on the Juno mission to Jupiter.

== See also ==
- Atmospheric sounding
- Instrumental temperature record
- Sea surface temperature
- Temperature record
- Outgoing longwave radiation
