= Richard Lindzen =

American atmospheric physicist

Richard S. Lindzen
- Born: February 8, 1940 (age 86); Webster, Massachusetts, U.S.
- Education: Harvard University (BA, MS, PhD)
- Known for: Iris hypothesis quasi-biennial oscillation Dynamic meteorology Atmospheric tides Ozone photochemistry
- Spouse: Nadine Lindzen
- Children: 2
- Awards: NCAR Outstanding Publication Award (1967); AMS Clarence Leroy Meisinger Award (1968); AGU; Macelwane Award (1969); Alfred P. Sloan Fellowship (1970); AMS Charney Award (1985); Member of the NAS
- Scientific career
- Fields: Atmospheric physics Applied mathematics
- Workplaces: University of Washington; University of Copenhagen; University of Oslo; National Center for Atmospheric Research; University of Chicago; Harvard University; Massachusetts Institute of Technology
- Thesis: Radiative and photochemical processes in strato- and mesospheric dynamics (1965)
- Doctoral advisor: Richard M. Goody

Richard Siegmund Lindzen (born February 8, 1940) is an American atmospheric physicist known for his work in the dynamics of the middle atmosphere, atmospheric tides, and ozone photochemistry. He is the author of more than 200 scientific papers. From 1972 to 1982, he served as the Gordon McKay Professor of Dynamic Meteorology at Harvard University. In 1983, he was appointed as the Alfred P. Sloan Professor of Meteorology at the Massachusetts Institute of Technology, where he would remain until his retirement in 2013. Lindzen has disputed the scientific consensus on climate change and criticizes what he has called "climate alarmism".

== Early life and education ==
Lindzen was born on February 8, 1940, in Webster, Massachusetts. His father, a shoemaker, had fled Nazi Germany with his mother. Lindzen moved to The Bronx soon after his birth and grew up in a Jewish household in a predominantly Catholic neighborhood.

Lindzen attended the Bronx High School of Science, where he won Regents' and National Merit Scholarships, then Rensselaer Polytechnic Institute before matriculating at Harvard University. In 1960, he graduated with a Bachelor of Arts in physics, magna cum laude, followed by a Master of Science degree in applied mathematics in 1961 and a Ph.D. in applied mathematics in 1964. His doctoral thesis, Radiative and photochemical processes in strato- and mesospheric dynamics, was about the interactions of ozone photochemistry, radiative transfer, and dynamics in the middle atmosphere.

== Career ==
Lindzen has published papers on Hadley circulation, monsoon meteorology, planetary atmospheres, hydrodynamic instability, mid-latitude weather, global heat transport, the water cycle, ice ages and seasonal atmospheric effects. His main contribution to the academic literature on anthropogenic climate change is his proposal of the iris hypothesis in 2001, with co-authors Ming-Dah Chou and Arthur Y. Hou.

Lindzen is a member of the National Academy of Sciences and the Science, Health, and Economic Advisory Council at the Annapolis Center for Science-Based Public Policy. He joined MIT in 1983, prior to which he held positions at the University of Washington (1964–65), the Institute for Theoretical Meteorology at the University of Copenhagen, the University of Oslo (1965–67), the National Center for Atmospheric Research (NCAR) (1966–67), and the University of Chicago (1968–72). From 1972 to 1982, he served as the Gordon McKay Professor of Dynamic Meteorology at Harvard University. Lindzen also briefly held a position of visiting lecturer at UCLA in 1967.

As of January 2010, his publications list included 230 papers and articles published between 1965 and 2008, with five in process for 2009. He is the author of a standard textbook on atmospheric dynamics, and co-authored the monograph Atmospheric Tides with Sydney Chapman.

He was Alfred P. Sloan Professor of Meteorology at MIT from 1983, until his retirement which was reported in the Spring 2013 newsletter of MIT's Department of Earth, Atmospheric and Planetary Sciences (EAPS). On December 27, 2013, the Cato Institute announced his appointment as a Distinguished Senior Fellow in its Center for the Study of Science.

== Early work (1964–1972) ==
Lindzen's early work was concerned with ozone photochemistry, the aerodynamics of the middle atmosphere, the theory of atmospheric tides, and planetary waves. His work in these areas led him to a number of fundamental scientific discoveries, including the discovery of negative equivalent depths in classical tidal theory, explanations for both the quasi-biennial oscillation of the Earth's stratosphere and the four-day period of the superrotation of the Venus atmosphere above the cloud top.

=== Ozone photochemistry ===
His PhD thesis of 1964 concerned the interactions of ozone photochemistry, radiative transfer and the dynamics of the middle atmosphere. This formed the basis of his seminal Radiative and Photochemical Processes in Mesospheric Dynamics that was published in four parts in the Journal of the Atmospheric Sciences between 1965 and 1966. The first of these, Part I: Models for Radiative and Photochemical Processes, was co-authored with his Harvard colleague and former PhD thesis advisor, Richard M. Goody, who is well known for his 1964 textbook Atmospheric Radiation. The Lindzen and Goody (1965) study has been widely cited as foundational in the exact modeling of middle atmosphere ozone photochemistry. This work was extended in 1973 to include the effects of nitrogen and hydrogen reactions with his former PhD student, Donna Blake, in Effect of photochemical models on calculated equilibria and cooling rates in the stratosphere.

Lindzen's work on ozone photochemistry has been important in studies that look at the effects that anthropogenic ozone depletion will have on climate.

=== Atmospheric tides ===
Since the time of Pierre-Simon Laplace (1799), scientists had been puzzled as to why pressure variations measured at the Earth's surface associated with the semi-diurnal solar tide dominate those of the diurnal tide in amplitude, when intuitively one would expect the diurnal passage of the sun to dominate. Lord Kelvin (1882) had proposed the so-called "resonance" theory, wherein the semi-diurnal tide would be "selected" over the diurnal oscillation if the atmosphere was somehow able to oscillate freely at a period of very close to 12 hours, in the same way that overtones are selected on a vibrating string. By the second half of the twentieth century, however, observations had failed to confirm this hypothesis, and an alternative hypothesis was proposed that something must instead suppress the diurnal tide. In 1961, Manfred Siebert suggested that absorption of solar insolation by tropospheric water vapour might account for the reduction of the diurnal tide. However, he failed to include a role for stratospheric ozone. This was rectified in 1963 by the Australian physicist Stuart Thomas Butler and his student K.A. Small who showed that stratospheric ozone absorbs an even greater part of the solar insolation.

Nevertheless, the predictions of classical tidal theory still did not agree with observations. It was Lindzen, in his 1966 paper, On the theory of the diurnal tide, who showed that the solution set of Hough functions given by Bernhard Haurwitz to Laplace's tidal equation was incomplete: modes with negative equivalent depths had been omitted. (Note: Susumu Kato had independently made the same discovery at about the same time in Japan.) Lindzen went on to calculate the thermal response of the diurnal tide to ozone and water vapor absorption in detail and showed that when his theoretical developments were included, the surface pressure oscillation was predicted with approximately the magnitude and phase observed, as were most of the features of the diurnal wind oscillations in the mesosphere. In 1967, along with his NCAR colleague, Douglas D. McKenzie, Lindzen extended the theory to include a term for Newtonian cooling due to emission of infrared radiation by carbon dioxide in the stratosphere along with ozone photochemical processes, and then in 1968 he showed that the theory also predicted that the semi-diurnal oscillation would be insensitive to variations in the temperature profile, which is why it is observed so much more strongly and regularly at the surface.

While holding the position of research scientist at the National Center for Atmospheric Research (NCAR) in Boulder, CO Lindzen was noticed and befriended by Professor Sydney Chapman, who had contributed to the theory of atmospheric tides in a number of papers from the 1920s through to the 1940s. This led to their joint publication in 1969 of a 186-page monograph (republished in 1970 as a book) Atmospheric Tides.

=== Quasi-biennial oscillation ===
Although it wasn't realized at the time, the quasi-biennial oscillation (QBO) was observed during the 1883 eruption of Krakatoa, when the ash from the volcano was transported around the globe from east to west by stratospheric winds in about two weeks. These winds became known as the "Krakatoa easterlies". It was observed again in 1908, by the German meteorologist Arthur Berson, who saw that winds blow from the west at 15 km (9.32 mi) altitude in tropical Africa from his balloon experiments. These became known as the "Berson westerlies". However, it was not until the early 1960s that the ~ 26-month cycle of the QBO was first described, independently by Richard J. Reed in 1960 and Veryhard and Ebdon in 1961.

Lindzen recalls his discovery of the mechanism underlying the QBO in the semi-autobiographical review article, On the development of the theory of the QBO. His interest in the phenomenon began in 1961 when his PhD advisor, Richard M. Goody, speculated that the 26-month relaxation time for stratospheric ozone at 25 km (15.53 mi) in the tropics might somehow be related to the 26-month period of the QBO, and suggested investigation of this idea as a thesis topic. In fact, Lindzen's, Radiative and photochemical processes in mesospheric dynamics, Part II: Vertical propagation of long period disturbances at the equator, documented the failure of this attempt to explain the QBO.

Lindzen's work on atmospheric tides led him to the study of planetary waves and the general circulation of atmospheres. By 1967, he had contributed a number of papers on the theory of waves in the middle atmosphere. In Planetary waves on beta planes, he developed a beta plane approximation for simplifying the equations of classical tidal theory, whilst at the same time developing planetary wave relations. He noticed from his equations that eastward-traveling waves (known as Rossby waves since their discovery in 1939 by Carl-Gustav Rossby) and westward-traveling waves (which Lindzen himself helped in establishing as "atmospheric Kelvin waves") with periods less than five days were "vertically trapped." At the same time, an important paper by Booker and Bretherton appeared, which Lindzen read with great interest. Booker and Bretherton showed that vertically propagating gravity waves were completely absorbed at a critical level.

In his 1968 paper with James R. Holton, A theory of the quasi-biennial oscillation, Lindzen presented his theory of the QBO after testing it in a two-dimensional (2-D) numerical model that had been developed by Holton and John M. Wallace. They showed that the QBO could be driven by vertically propagating gravity waves with phase speeds in both westward and eastward directions and that the oscillation arose through a mechanism involving a two-way feedback between the waves and the mean flow. It was a bold conjecture, given that there was very little observational evidence available to either confirm or confute the hypothesis. In particular, there was still no observational evidence of the westward-traveling "Kelvin" waves; Lindzen postulated their existence theoretically. (Note: Actually, the evidence was coming in at the time, see Wallace, JM; Kousky, VE (1967). "Observational evidence of Kelvin waves in the tropical stratosphere". J. Atmos. Sci. 25 (5): 900–7. Bibcode:1968JAtS...25..900W. doi:10.1175/1520-0469(1968)025<0900:OEOKWI>2.0.CO;2. However, Lindzen says in his 1987 recollections that he did not see this study until after the Lindzen & Holton 1968 paper was already submitted.)

In the years following the publication of Lindzen and Holton (1968), more observational evidence became available, and Lindzen's fundamental insight into the mechanism driving the QBO was confirmed. However, the theory of interaction via critical level absorption was found to be incomplete and was modified to include the importance of attenuation due to radiative cooling. The revised theory was published in the Holton and Lindzen (1972) paper, An updated theory for the quasibiennial cycle of the tropical stratosphere.

=== Superrotation of Venus ===
Since the 1960s a puzzling phenomenon has been observed in the atmosphere of Venus. The atmosphere above the cloud base is seen to travel around the planet about 50 times faster than the rotation of the planet surface, or in only four to five Earth-days. In 1974 a theory was proposed by Stephen B. Fels and Lindzen to explain this so-called "superrotation" which held that the rotation is driven by the thermal atmospheric tide. An alternative theory was proposed by Peter J. Gierasch in the following year which held instead that the meridional (Hadley) circulation may transport the momentum by eddy-mixing. As of 2005, the actual cause of this phenomenon continued to be debated in the literature, with General Circulation Model experiments suggesting that both the Fels/Lindzen and Gierasch mechanisms are involved.

== Middle period (1972–1990) ==
From 1972 to 1982 Lindzen was a professor of dynamic meteorology at Harvard University. From February to June 1975 he was a visiting professor of dynamic meteorology at MIT, and during part of 1979 Lindzen was a visiting professor at the Hebrew University of Jerusalem, before switching affiliations to MIT as the Alfred P. Sloan Professor of Meteorology in 1983.

During this time, Lindzen published some research on gravity waves, as well as Hadley circulations. He is named as one of 16 Scientific Members of the team authoring the National Academy of Sciences 1975 publication Understanding Climatic Change: A Program for Action.

== Final period (1990–2010) ==
=== Climate sensitivity ===
Lindzen hypothesized that the Earth may act like an infrared iris. A sea surface temperature increase in the tropics would result in reduced cirrus clouds and thus more infrared radiation leakage from Earth's atmosphere. Additionally, rising temperatures would cause more extensive drying due to increased areas of atmospheric subsidence. This hypothesis suggests a negative feedback which would counter the effects of CO_{2} warming by lowering the climate sensitivity. Satellite data from CERES has led researchers investigating Lindzen's theory to conclude that the Iris effect would instead warm the atmosphere. Lindzen disputed this, claiming that the negative feedback from high-level clouds was still larger than the weak positive feedback estimated by Lin et al.

Lindzen has expressed his concern over the validity of computer models used to predict future climate change. Lindzen said that predicted warming may be overestimated because of their handling of the climate system's water vapor feedback. The feedback due to water vapor is a major factor in determining how much warming would be expected to occur with increased atmospheric concentrations of carbon dioxide, and all existing computer models assume positive feedback — that is, that as the climate warms, the amount of water vapour held in the atmosphere will increase, leading to further warming. By contrast, Lindzen believes that temperature increases will actually cause more extensive drying due to increased areas of atmospheric subsidence as a result of the Iris effect, nullifying future warming. This claim was criticized by climatologist Gavin Schmidt, Director of NASA's Goddard Institute for Space Studies, who notes the more generally-accepted understanding of the effects of the Iris effect and cites empirical cases where large and relatively rapid changes in the climate such as El Niño events, the Ultra-Plinian eruption of Mount Pinatubo in 1991, and recent trends in global temperature and water vapor levels show that, as predicted in the generally-accepted view, water vapor increases as the temperature increases, and decreases as temperatures decrease.

Contrary to the IPCC's assessment in 2001, Lindzen said that climate models are inadequate. Despite accepted errors in their models, e.g., treatment of clouds, modelers still thought their climate predictions were valid. Lindzen has stated that due to the non-linear effects of carbon dioxide in the atmosphere, CO_{2} levels are now around 30% higher than pre-industrial levels but temperatures have responded by about 75% 0.6 °C (1.08 °F) of the expected value for a doubling of CO_{2}. The IPCC (2007) estimates that the expected rise in temperature due to a doubling of CO_{2} to be about 3 °C (5.4 °F), ± 1.5°. Lindzen has given estimates of the Earth's climate sensitivity to be 0.5 °C based on ERBE data. These estimates were criticized by Kevin E. Trenberth and others, and Lindzen accepted that his paper included "some stupid mistakes". When interviewed, he said "It was just embarrassing", and added that "The technical details of satellite measurements are really sort of grotesque." Lindzen and Choi revised their paper and submitted it to PNAS. The four reviewers of the paper, two of whom had been selected by Lindzen, strongly criticized the paper and PNAS rejected it for publication. Lindzen and Choi then succeeded in getting a little known Korean journal to publish it as a 2011 paper. Andrew Dessler published a paper which found errors in Lindzen and Choi 2011, and concluded that the observations it had presented "are not in fundamental disagreement with mainstream climate models, nor do they provide evidence that clouds are causing climate change. Suggestions that significant revisions to mainstream climate science are required are therefore not supported."

=== NAS panel ===
In 2001, Lindzen served on an 11-member panel organized by the National Academy of Sciences. The panel's report, titled Climate Change Science: An Analysis of Some Key Questions, has been widely cited. Lindzen subsequently publicly criticized the report summary for not referring to the statement in the full report that twenty years of temperature measurements was "too short a period for estimating long term trends".

=== IPCC activities ===
Lindzen worked on Chapter 7 of 2001 IPCC Working Group 1, which considers the physical processes that are active in real world climate. He had previously been a contributor to Chapter 4 of the 1995 "IPCC Second Assessment". He described the full 2001 IPCC report as "an admirable description of research activities in climate science" although he criticized the Summary for Policymakers. Lindzen stated in May 2001 that it did not truly summarize the IPCC report but had been amended to state more definite conclusions. He also emphasized the fact that the summary had not been written by scientists alone. The NAS panel on which Lindzen served says that the summary was the result of dialogue between scientists and policymakers. (Note: The NAS panel said on the matter that "The committee finds that the full IPCC Working Group I (WGI) report is an admirable summary of research activities in climate science, and the full report is adequately summarized in the Technical Summary. The full WGI report and its Technical Summary are not specifically directed at policy. The Summary for Policymakers reflects less emphasis on communicating the basis for uncertainty and a stronger emphasis on areas of major concern associated with human-induced climate change. This change in emphasis appears to be the result of a summary process in which scientists work with policy makers on the document. Written responses from U.S. coordinating and lead scientific authors to the committee indicate, however, that (a) no changes were made without the consent of the convening lead authors (this group represents a fraction of the lead and contributing authors) and (b) most changes that did occur lacked significant impact".)

=== Work at Cato Institute ===
Lindzen was a featured speaker at a Cato Institute conference, "Global Environmental Crisis: Science or Politics?" on June 5 (World Environment Day) and June 6, 1991. The conference was identified in 2019 in the book Kochland by business writer Christopher Leonard as a previously unhighlighted early landmark in the efforts by the fossil fuel multi-billionaire Koch brothers to promote questions about climate science. Cato Institute was "founded and heavily funded for years" by the Kochs, and Lindzen was prominently quoted in the brochure for the conference.

The notion that global warming is a fact and will be catastrophic is drilled into people to the point where it seems surprising that anyone would question it, and yet, underlying it is very little evidence at all. Nonetheless, there are statements made of such overt unrealism that I feel embarrassed. I feel it discredits science. I think problems will arise when one will need to depend on scientific judgment, and by ruining our credibility now you leave society with a resource of some importance diminished.

The title of the presentation Lindzen made at the conference was "Critical Issues in Climate Forecasting".

In an announcement on December 27, 2013, the Institute said that in a new position at Cato, Lindzen's focus would be on "the interaction between science and policymakers" and that he would study "whether the move from largely private funding to public support has introduced biases into science and the public policies informed by science."

By mid-2019, Lindzen was no longer affiliated with the Cato institute.

== Views on climate change ==
In June 1992, a year after the Cato Institute conference, Lindzen signed the Heidelberg Appeal.

He has criticized the scientific consensus on global climate change, claiming that scientists are just as liable to err when the science appears to point in just one direction. He drew an analogy in 1996 between the consensus in the early and mid-twentieth century on eugenics and the current consensus about global warming. In a 2007 interview on The Larry King Show, Lindzen said:

We're talking of a few tenths of a degree change in temperature. None of it in the last eight years, by the way. And if we had warming, it should be accomplished by less storminess. But because the temperature itself is so unspectacular, we have developed all sorts of fear of prospect scenarios – of flooding, of plague, of increased storminess when the physics says we should see less. I think it's mainly just like little kids locking themselves in dark closets to see how much they can scare each other and themselves.

In a 2009 editorial in The Wall Street Journal, Lindzen said that the earth was just emerging from the Little Ice Age in the 19th century and that it was "not surprising" to see warming after that. Lindzen stated that the IPCC's 2001 findings were

Based on the weak argument that the current models used by the IPCC couldn't reproduce the warming from about 1978 to 1998 without some forcing, and that the only forcing that they could think of was man. Even this argument assumes that these models adequately deal with natural internal variability—that is, such naturally occurring cycles as El Niño, the Pacific Decadal Oscillation, the Atlantic Multidecadal Oscillation, etc. Yet articles from major modeling centers acknowledged that the failure of these models to anticipate the absence of warming for the past dozen years was due to the failure of these models to account for this natural internal variability. Thus even the basis for the weak IPCC argument for anthropogenic climate change was shown to be false.

According to an April 30, 2012 New York Times article, "Dr. Lindzen accepts the elementary tenets of climate science. He agrees that carbon dioxide is a greenhouse gas, calling people who dispute that point 'nutty.' He agrees that the level of it is rising because of human activity and that this should warm the climate." He also believes that decreasing tropical cirrus clouds in a warmer world will allow more longwave radiation to escape the atmosphere, counteracting the warming. Lindzen first published this "iris" theory in 2001, and offered more support in a 2009 paper.

=== Comments addressed to U.S. policymakers ===
Starting in 1991, Lindzen has provided testimonies to the U.S. Senate and House committees (regarding his understandings of the current state of research on climate change) multiple times.

In 2001, Lindzen urged the Bush administration not to ratify the Kyoto Protocol. In a letter to Mayor David B. Cohen of Newton, Massachusetts, Lindzen wrote that he believed the Kyoto Protocol would increase the cost of electricity for no gain, putting signatory states at a competitive disadvantage.

In 2017, Lindzen sent a petition to President Trump, asking the President to withdraw the United States from the United Nations Convention on Climate Change. The petition contained the names of "around 300 eminent scientists and other qualified individuals", and called on the United States and other nations to "change course on an outdated international agreement that targets minor greenhouse gases", starting with carbon dioxide. It received considerable media coverage; 22 then- current or retired MIT professors promptly issued an open letter addressed to Trump saying that Lindzen's petition does not represent their views or those of the vast majority of other climate scientists.

=== Third-party characterizations of Lindzen ===
An April 30, 2012, article in The New York Times included the comments of several other experts. Christopher S. Bretherton, an atmospheric researcher at the University of Washington, said Lindzen is "feeding upon an audience that wants to hear a certain message, and wants to hear it put forth by people with enough scientific reputation that it can be sustained for a while, even if it's wrong science. I don't think it's intellectually honest at all." Kerry A. Emanuel, another M.I.T. scientist, said of Lindzen's views "Even if there were no political implications, it just seems deeply unprofessional and irresponsible to look at this and say, 'We're sure it's not a problem.' It's a special kind of risk, because it's a risk to the collective civilization."

A 1996 article in The New York Times included the comments of several other experts. Jerry D. Mahlman, director of the Geophysical Fluid Dynamics Laboratory, did not accept Lindzen's assessment of the science, and said that Lindzen had "sacrificed his luminosity by taking a stand that most of us feel is scientifically unsound." Mahlman did, however, admit that Lindzen was a "formidable opponent". William Gray of Colorado State University basically agreed with Lindzen, describing him as "courageous". He said, "A lot of my older colleagues are very skeptical on the global warming thing". He added that while he regarded some of Lindzen's views as flawed, he said that, "across the board he's generally very good". John Wallace of the University of Washington agreed with Lindzen that progress in climate change science had been exaggerated, but said there are "relatively few scientists who are as skeptical of the whole thing as Dick [Lindzen] is".

The November 10, 2004, online version of Reason magazine reported that Lindzen is "willing to take bets that global average temperatures in 20 years will in fact be lower than they are now". However, on June 8, 2005, they reported that Lindzen insisted that he had been misquoted, after James Annan contacted Lindzen to make the bet but claimed that "Lindzen would take only 50 to 1 odds".

The Guardian claimed in June 2016 that Lindzen had been a beneficiary of Peabody Energy, a coal company that has funded multiple groups contesting the climate consensus, but it said it had not seen "amounts or dates".

Lindzen has been called a contrarian, in relation to climate change and other issues. Lindzen's graduate students describe him as "fiercely intelligent, with a deep contrarian streak."

== Smoking and lung cancer ==
The characterization of Lindzen as a contrarian has been reinforced by reports that he claims that lung cancer has only been weakly linked to smoking. When asked about this during an interview as part of an Australian Broadcasting Corporation documentary, Lindzen said that while "the case for second-hand tobacco is not very good ... the World Health Organization also said that" (referencing a 1998 study by the International Agency for Research on Cancer (IARC) on environmental tobacco smoke (ETS)), on the other hand "With first-hand smoke it's a more interesting issue ... The case for lung cancer is very good but it also ignores the fact that there are differences in people's susceptibilities which the Japanese studies have pointed to." Again, when asked to clarify his position Lindzen wrote "there was a reasonable case for the role of cigarette smoking in lung cancer, but that the case was not so strong that one should rule that any questions were out of order ... the much, much weaker case against second hand smoke [is] also being treated as dogma."

== Awards and honors ==
- National Center for Atmospheric Research Outstanding Publication Award (1967)
- American Meteorological Society Clarence Leroy Meisinger Award (1968)
- American Geophysical Union Macelwane Award (1969)
- Alfred P. Sloan Research Fellowship (1970–1976)
- AMS Charney Award (1985)
- Fellow of the Japan Society for the Promotion of Science (1986)
- Fellow of the American Academy of Arts and Sciences
- Fellow of the American Association for the Advancement of Science
- Fellow of the American Geophysical Union
- Fellow of the American Meteorological Society
- Fellow of the United States National Academy of Sciences
- Member of the Norwegian Academy of Science and Letters
- Member of the European Academy of Sciences and Arts
- Corresponding member of the NAS Committee on Human Rights
- Member of the United States National Research Council Board on Atmospheric Sciences and Climate
- Consultant to the Global Modeling and Simulation Group at NASA's Goddard Space Flight Center
- Distinguished Visiting Scientist at California Institute of Technology's Jet Propulsion Laboratory (1988– )
- ISI highly cited researcher
- Leo Prize, Wallin Foundation (2006)
- Petr Beckmann Award of Doctors for Disaster Preparedness (2012)
- Entry in American Men and Women of Science.

== Personal life ==
Richard Lindzen and his wife, Nadine, have two sons. Lindzen's interests include amateur radio, photography, and oriental rugs.

Lindzen lives in Newton, Massachusetts.

== Selected publications ==
=== Articles ===
- Lindzen, Richard Siegmund (1992). "Global Warming: The Origin and Nature of the Alleged Scientific Consensus". Regulation. 15 (2): 87–98.
- ——— (July 26, 2009). "Resisting climate hysteria". Quadrant.
- ——— (November 30, 2009). "The Climate Science Isn't Settled". The Wall Street Journal.
- ——— (April 24, 2010). "Alarmists keep ringing the bell". The Australian. Archived from the original on May 3, 2011.
- "What Catastrophe? MIT's Richard Lindzen, the unalarmed climate scientist", The Weekly Standard, January 13, 2014

=== Books ===
- Lindzen, Richard Siegmund (1990). Dynamics in Atmospheric Physics. Cambridge University Press. doi:10.1017/CBO9780511608285. ISBN 978-0-521-01821-0. Archived from the original on February 4, 2014.

=== Peer-reviewed papers ===
- Lindzen, Richard Siegmund (1981). "Turbulence and Stress Owing to Gravity Wave and Tidal Breakdown". Journal of Geophysical Research. 86 (C10): 9707–14. Bibcode:1981JGR....86.9707L. doi:10.1029/JC086iC10p09707.
- ———; Nigam, Sumant (1987). "On the Role of Sea Surface Temperature Gradients in Forcing Low-Level Winds and Convergence in the Tropics". Journal of the Atmospheric Sciences. 44 (17): 2418–36. Bibcode:1987JAtS...44.2418L. doi:10.1175/1520-0469(1987)044<2418:OTROSS>2.0.CO;2.
- ——— (1990). "Some Coolness Concerning Global Warming". Bulletin of the American Meteorological Society. 71 (3): 288–99. Bibcode:1990BAMS...71..288L. doi:10.1175/1520-0477(1990)071<0288:SCCGW>2.0.CO;2.
- ——— (1997). "Can increasing carbon dioxide cause climate change?". Proceedings of the National Academy of Sciences of the United States of America. 94 (16): 8335–42. Bibcode:1997PNAS...94.8335L. doi:10.1073/pnas.94.16.8335. PMC 33750. PMID 11607742.
- ———; Chou, Ming-Dah; Hou, Arthur Y. (2001). "Does the Earth Have an Adaptive Infrared Iris?". Bulletin of the American Meteorological Society. 82 (3): 417–32. Bibcode:2001BAMS...82..417L. doi:10.1175/1520-0477(2001)082<0417:DTEHAA>2.3.CO;2. hdl:2060/20000081750.
- ———; Choi, Yong-Sang (2009). "On the determination of climate feedbacks from ERBE data". Geophysical Research Letters. 36 (16) 2009GL039628. Bibcode:2009GeoRL..3616705L. doi:10.1029/2009GL039628.
- ———; Lindzen, Richard Siegmund (2010). "Space observations of cold-cloud phase change". Proceedings of the National Academy of Sciences. 107 (25): 11211–11216. Bibcode:2010PNAS..10711211C. doi:10.1073/pnas.1006241107. PMC 2895094. PMID 20534562.
- ———; Choi, Yong-Sang (2011). "On the observational determination of climate sensitivity and its implications". Asia-Pacific Journal of the Atmospheric Sciences. 47 (4): 377–90. Bibcode:2011APJAS..47..377L. CiteSeerX 10.1.1.167.11. doi:10.1007/s13143-011-0023-x. S2CID 9278311.
- ——— (2011). "Climate physics, feedbacks, and reductionism (and when does reductionism go too far?)". The European Physical Journal Plus. 127 (5) 52. Bibcode:2012EPJP..127...52L. doi:10.1140/epjp/i2012-12052-8. S2CID 121410060.

== Bibliography ==
- Lindzen, Richard Siegmund (1987), "On the development of the theory of the QBO" (PDF), Bull. Am. Meteorol. Soc., 68 (4): 329–37, Bibcode:1987BAMS...68..329L, doi:10.1175/1520-0477(1987)068<0329:OTDOTT>2.0.CO;2, S2CID 121259197, archived from the original (PDF) on June 13, 2010.
