= Regulation of greenhouse gases under the Clean Air Act =

Regulation under 1963 US federal law

In relation to the Clean Air Act (CAA) of 1963, an endangerment finding is an analysis of whether changes to the atmosphere endanger the public. The act includes a requirement for EPA administrators to issue rules to set (and from time to time revise) standards for new motor vehicles or new motor vehicle engines, to regulate emissions of any air pollution which, in the Administrator's opinion, may reasonably be anticipated to endanger public health or public welfare. After the IPCC Second Assessment Report of 1995 described increasing evidence of human caused climate change, petitioners asked the United States Environmental Protection Agency (EPA) to rule that greenhouse gases (GHGs) endanger public health and welfare.

Its refusal, under the George W. Bush Administration, led to a series of court cases culminating in the United States Supreme Court's 2007 Massachusetts v. Environmental Protection Agency decision that the plaintiff had standing, and the act required the EPA to make the analysis. It took another 2 years, until incoming EPA administrator Lisa Jackson decided the so called Endangerment Finding in 2009, which formed the basis for regulation on January 2, 2011. Standards for mobile sources have since been established pursuant to Section 202 of the CAA, and GHGs from stationary sources have been controlled under the authority of Part C of Title I of the act. In June 2012, the basis for regulations was upheld in the United States Court of Appeals for the District of Columbia .

In 2025, EPA administrator Lee Zeldin under the second Trump administration announced intent to deregulate greenhouse gases, and in July proposed to undo the endangerment finding. Trump and Zeldin announced revocation of the finding on February 12, 2026, and the "Final Rule: Rescission of the Greenhouse Gas Endangerment Finding and Motor Vehicle Greenhouse Gas Emission Standards Under the Clean Air Act" was published that day on the EPA website, to become effective 60 days after publication in the Federal Register.

Various regional climate change initiatives in the United States have been undertaken by state and local governments, in addition to federal Clean Air Act regulations.

== History ==
=== Initial petition 1999 and initial denial 2003 ===
Section 202(a)(1) of the Clean Air Act requires the Administrator of the EPA to establish standards "applicable to the emission of any air pollutant from ... new motor vehicles or new motor vehicle engines, which in [her] judgment cause, or contribute to, air pollution which may reasonably be anticipated to endanger public health or welfare" (emphasis added). On October 20, 1999, the International Center for Technology Assessment (ICTA) and several other parties (petitioners) petitioned the EPA to regulate greenhouse gases from new motor vehicles under the act. The petitioners argued that carbon dioxide (CO_{2}), methane (CH_{4}), nitrous oxide (N_{2}O), and hydrofluorocarbons meet the definition of an air pollutant under section 302(g) of the act, and that statements made by the EPA, other federal agencies, and the United Nations Intergovernmental Panel on Climate Change (IPCC) amounted to a finding that these pollutants are reasonably anticipated to endanger public health and welfare. Based on these factors, the petitioners asserted that EPA had a mandatory duty to regulate greenhouse gases under section 202 of the act, and asked the agency to carry out that duty.

On September 8, 2003, EPA denied the ICTA petition on the ground that it did not have authority under the CAA to promulgate regulations to address global climate change and that CO_{2} and other GHGs therefore could not be considered air pollutants under the provisions of the CAA, including section 202. The agency further stated that even if it had the authority to regulate GHGs from motor vehicles, it would decline to do so as a matter of policy. The agency maintained that regulating motor vehicle GHG emissions would neither address the global problem effectively, nor be consistent with President Bush's policies for addressing climate change, which centered on non-regulatory efforts such as voluntary reductions in GHGs, public-private partnerships aimed at reducing the economy's reliance on fossil fuels, and research to probe into scientific uncertainties regarding climate change.

=== Supreme Court requires regulation, 2006 ===
The agency's action on the ICTA petition set the stage for a prolonged legal battle, which was eventually argued before the Supreme Court on November 29, 2006.

In a 5–4 decision in Massachusetts v. Environmental Protection Agency, the Supreme Court held that "greenhouse gases fit well within the Act's capacious definition of 'air pollutant' " and that EPA therefore has statutory authority to regulate GHG emissions from new motor vehicles. The court further ruled that "policy judgments have nothing to do with whether greenhouse gas emissions contribute to climate change and do not amount to a reasoned justification for declining to form a scientific judgment." In EPA's view, this required the agency to make a positive or negative endangerment finding under Section 202(a) of the CAA whether greenhouse gas emissions from new motor vehicles "cause or contribute to air pollution which may be reasonably be anticipated to endanger public health or welfare, or whether the science is too uncertain to make a reasoned decision" .

=== EPA endangerment findings, 2009 ===
On December 7, 2009, EPA Administrator Lisa Jackson found that, under section 202(a) of the Clean Air Act, greenhouse gases threaten both the public health and the public welfare, and that greenhouse gas emissions from motor vehicles contribute to that threat. The two distinct findings were:

1) The Endangerment Finding, in which the Administrator found that the mix of atmospheric concentrations of six key, well-mixed greenhouse gases threatens both the public health and the public welfare of current and future generations. These six greenhouse gases are:

- carbon dioxide (CO_{2})
- methane (CH_{4})
- nitrous oxide (N_{2}O)
- hydrofluorocarbons (HFCs)
- perfluorocarbons (PFCs)
- sulfur hexafluoride (SF_{6})

These greenhouse gases in the atmosphere constitute the "air pollution" that threatens both public health and welfare.

2) The Cause or Contribute Finding, in which the Administrator found that the combined greenhouse gas emissions from new motor vehicles and motor vehicle engines contribute to the atmospheric concentrations of these key greenhouse gases and hence to the threat of climate change.

EPA hence set the greenhouse gas emission standards to light-duty vehicles proposed jointly with the Department of Transportation's Corporate Average Fuel Economy (CAFE) standards in 2009.

The advocacy groups Center for Biological Diversity and 350.org had requested, in December 2009, that the EPA set the NAAQS for carbon dioxide at no greater than 350 ppm. In addition to the six pollutants mentioned in the lawsuit, they proposed that nitrogen trifluoride (NF_{3}) be added as a seventh regulated greenhouse gas.

=== Inflation Reduction Act of 2022 ===
In June 2022, the Supreme Court found in West Virginia v. EPA that Congress did not authorize the EPA to regulate "outside the fence" options such as introducing renewable sources for regulations of power plants as the EPA had proposed in the Obama administration's Clean Power Plan. The Court did still acknowledge that, as per Massachusetts, the EPA could still regulate carbon dioxide as a pollutant under the CAA. As a result, building upon an economic stimulus bill to support Joe Biden's policies, Congress passed the Inflation Reduction Act of 2022 in August of that year. In its language, the bill specifically identifies carbon dioxide and other greenhouse gases earlier defined by the EPA as regulated pollutants under the EPA's remit. The bill also gives the EPA more than $27 billion in funding for regulation under the CAA, through a green bank for carbon dioxide and direct grants for methane.

=== Second Trump administration, 2025 policy to repeal emission standards ===
As advocated in Project 2025, policies of the second Trump administration rolled back the U.S. Global Change Research Program, instead instituting the National Energy Dominance Council. Executive Order 14154 "Unleashing American Energy", signed on inauguration day (January 20, 2025), directed the EPA to report "on the legality and continuing applicability" of the Endangerment findings. Trump had called climate change a "hoax" and the "green new scam". Lee Zeldin was appointed administrator of the EPA in January, on 19 February he sent the White House Office of Management and Budget (OMB) a nine-page memo saying developments in climate science, engineering, economics and law, including a 2024 Supreme Court ruling limiting agency discretion where statutory text was ambiguous, invalidated the endangerment finding and any EPA regulation or action that relied on it. On February 25 his recommendation to end the Federal position that greenhouse gases endanger the public was publicised.

On March 12, 2025, Zeldin announced "the greatest day of deregulation our nation has seen", stating that "We are driving a dagger straight into the heart of the climate change religion", including "Reconsideration of the 2009 Endangerment Finding and regulations and actions that rely on that Finding (Endangerment Finding)". The new Energy Secretary Chris Wright, previously CEO of fracking services company Liberty Energy, had long argued that benefits of fossil fuels outweighed potential dangers. In late March, he phoned scientists he knew for rejecting aspects of mainstream climate science, starting with Roy Spencer, and invited them to work on a climate study. Soon, John Christy, Steven Koonin and Judith Curry agreed to join a DOE working group, along with environmental economist Ross McKitrick. Wright also arranged coordination by Cato Institute energy analyst Travis Fisher. The completed DOE Climate Working Group report, dated 27 May, was issued on that date to the EPA for review by Zeldin. In its proposed endangerment repeal, the EPA said it had "reviewed and relied upon" this draft version of the DOE report. The U.S. had led development of research into climate change, significantly supported by the National Science Foundation, NOAA and NASA. These now faced drastic cuts. Hundreds of scientists and researchers working on the sixth National Climate Assessment were told by email on 28 April that they were dismissed, and the scope of the report was "currently being re-evaluated". Plans to deregulate power plant emissions were announced by the EPA on June 11, then it sent its proposed "Reconsideration of 2009 Endangerment Finding and Greenhouse Gas Vehicle Standards" to the OMB on June 30, to "be published for public notice and comment once it has completed interagency review and been signed by the Administrator".

Formation of the DOE Climate Working Group had yet to be announced but, on July 8, the New York Times (NYT) reported that the administration had been recruiting scientists to help to repeal the Endangerment Finding. It said that the DOE had given positions to Christy and Spencer, and hired Koonin as a special government employee, describing them as known from industry lobbying groups for rejecting consensus climate science. CNN described them as climate contrarians. On July 22 the NYT reported two sources saying that the EPA draft plan to rescind the Endangerment Finding had been sent to the White House for approval, In a podcast issued on July 29, Zeldin announced "the largest deregulatory action in the history of America". At an event held that day in an Indiana warehouse of the Kenworth commercial truck dealership, Zeldin released the EPA proposal to rescind its Endangerment Finding and repeal all resulting greenhouse gas emissions regulations for motor vehicles and engines. He said this "would end $1 trillion or more in hidden taxes on American businesses and families". DOE Secretary Chris Wright said he had commissioned the DOE Climate Working Group study, by scientists he had selected who "have not been cowed by the politics of climate change", and it was released as A Critical Review of Impacts of Greenhouse Gas Emissions on the U.S. Climate. It was addressed to Wright, with a foreword by him, and dated July 23, 2025. The DOE CWG report was immediately criticized for cherry-picking evidence to support its positions, misrepresenting the results of multiple scientists, and highlighting uncertainties to imply that a scientific consensus does not exist. Its authors tried to portray the science as a debate, and under the first Trump administration they were included in proposals for a red team, challenging consensus climate science. The mainstream "blue team" was misrepresented; for example, climate scientist Andrew Dessler (of Texas A&M University, found parts of his research included, but taken out of context and filtered to give a misleading impression. He subsequently helped coordinate a response by scientists to the DOE CWG report. Historian of science Naomi Oreskes said "Climate denial is now the official policy of the U.S. government."

The EPA "Proposed Rule. Reconsideration of 2009 Endangerment Finding and Greenhouse Gas Vehicle Standards" was officially posted on August 1, beginning a public comment period ending on September 15, (later extended to midday on September 22, 2025). It proposed repeal of all greenhouse gas emission standards for vehicles or engines, asserting they were not authorized by the Clean Air Act, or alternatively alleging significant doubt of the reliability of the previous analysis and findings on scientific records, or "on the alternative bases that no requisite technology for vehicle and engine emission control can address the global climate change concerns identified in the findings without risking greater harms to public health and welfare." The EPA rule said it had considered reports including the IPCC Sixth Assessment Report (2023), which represents a widespread global consensus on climate science, and the National Climate Assessment which had been removed from government websites, but referred to "the most recently available science" and extensively cited the May 27 draft of the CWG Report. Also on August 1, 2025, the Department Of Energy sought "public comment on the draft report produced by DOE's Climate Working Group (CWG), titled 'A Critical Review of Impacts of Greenhouse Gas Emissions on the U.S. Climate' (CWG Report)." The notice included an overview, and required written comments to be submitted on or before September 2, 2025.

As legal justification, the EPA proposed a new narrow reading of the Clean Air Act to end any federal regulation of greenhouse gas emissions, presenting various arguments based on a selective reading of the regulatory history of the act and of Supreme Court precedent. Relying on the CWG Report and disregarding scientific consensus, it concluded that harm caused by regulating vehicle emissions exceeded benefits, and alternatively proposed rescinding all regulation of GHGs emitted from U.S. vehicles, with or without the Endangerment Finding. The rule would be challenged in courts, but the composition of the supreme court had changed, and if it overturned the 2006 decision this could prevent future administrations from using the clean air act to regulate greenhouse gas emissions.

The National Academies announced, on August 7, a committee led by Shirley M. Tilghman to "review the latest scientific evidence on whether greenhouse gas emissions are reasonably anticipated to endanger public health and welfare in the U.S." producing a self-funded fast-track assessment for the EPA public comment period deadline. Dessler said "This is what the DOE should have done all along, rather than hire five people who represent a tiny minority of the scientific community and have views that virtually nobody else agrees with." Around 70 academics had already responded to his Bluesky post inviting participation in a coordinated response to the DOE and EPA invitations to comment, and experts consulted by Carbon Brief reported multiple false or misleading claims in the DOE report.

The Environmental Defense Fund (EDF) and the Union of Concerned Scientists (UCS) filed a lawsuit in the District of Massachusetts' Federal District Court on August 12, naming Energy Secretary Wright, the DOE, the EPA, Administrator Zeldin, and the Climate Working Group. The suit argues that the formation of the Climate Working Group and creation and use of A Critical Review of Impacts violated Congress's Federal Advisory Committee Act (FACA), which directs "that federal government advisory committees cannot form or operate in secret, that materials they create must be available to the public, and that they must have balanced membership." In the federal process required to change rules, the EPA had to consider and respond to significant public comments. It began public hearings on August 19. AP reported that the proposed rule relied heavily on the DOE CWG report, which many scientists said was biased and distorted to manufacture doubt about the effects of climate change. A Statement of the American Meteorological Society, adopted on August 27, identified five foundational flaws which put the DOE report at odds with scientific principles and practices, so it was not useful as a basis for informed policy and decision making. It lacked breadth across scientific fields, did not reflect the full range of defensible expert views within the specific areas covered, was based on views of an unrepresentative group of subject matter experts which were not new but had already been thoroughly tested and considered by the larger community of scientists, and it selectively emphasized a small set of unrepresentative findings to downplay and exclude harmful effects.

Dessler and Robert Kopp of Rutgers University co-edited a "Climate Experts' Review" a 439-page compendium of public comments on the 151-page DOE CWG draft report, contributed by more than 85 experts. After a Summary for Policy Makers, the review "contains 48 distinct Comments, each of which makes a variety of points regarding different elements of the CWG report and the report as a whole. Authorship of each Comment is separately noted. It concludes with biographical sketches providing the authors’ credentials." On August 30, they submitted this compendium to the DOE, with a covering letter to Wright which concluded that the CWG draft report "currently fails to adequately represent the scientific understanding of climate change. DOE must subject the CWG report to unbiased, robust, and transparent peer review under the Information Quality Act and other federal requirements. Accordingly, it will require very substantial revision before it can be relied upon by any federal agency or other entity." Dessler said the CWG report "makes a mockery of science. It relies on ideas that were rejected long ago, supported by misrepresentations of the body of scientific knowledge, omissions of important facts, arm waving, anecdotes, and confirmation bias". A DOE statement said the "report was reviewed internally by DOE scientific researchers and policy experts from the Office of Science and National Labs. The report is open to wider peer review from the scientific community and general public via the public comment period." Science policy analyst Roger A. Pielke Jr., of the American Enterprise Institute, said that "given the composition of the Supreme Court, the endangerment finding might be in danger. But it’s not going to be because of the science". The comment period for the DOE CWG Report ended on September 2, with 59,563 comments received. That day, Curry blogged that CWG work was "currently on hold" because of the lawsuit about FACA compliance. DOE said "the draft report and the public comments it solicited achieved the purpose of the CWG, namely to catalyze broader discussion about the certainties and uncertainties of current climate science", and did not withdraw it. Curry told CNN that the group was "still working independently", and planned to "issue a revised report and respond to any serious comments."

The House Committee on Oversight and Government Reform announced on September 3 that its chair James Comer had written that day to the National Academies president asking for "documents and communications related to the fast-track review and any potential partisan bias within it", as it was "without any apparent request from a U.S. Government agency or entity" and appeared "to be inconsistent with the purpose of the National Academies and a blatant partisan act to undermine the Trump Administration. With such an unprecedented short timeline for reviewing evidence gathered over a 16-year period, the Committee is additionally concerned that the results of this study have been predetermined." The letter demanded various documents including correspondence and lists of NAS funding, and made allegations such as the suggestion that NAS support for politicians wanting action on climate change could be a conflict of interest. More broadly, the Appropriations Committee alleged unspecified "lack of objective nonpartisan research methods" by NAS. It warned federal agencies "to use caution" and "to consider alternative means for obtaining objective scientific review." A NAS statement said "we are nonpartisan and remain committed to delivering independent, objective, peer-reviewed analysis and advice." The threat of investigation did not hold back the NAS assessment.

In advance of a court hearing, the defendants said claims "that an alleged advisory committee is operating in violation of FACA" would become moot "when the advisory committee ceases to exist". On 10 September, Curry said the intention had been "for us to be affiliated with the DOE for a short time to put this together," and "they really didn’t dot all the I’s and cross the T’s. ... The DOE dropped the ball on really making us an official group affiliated with the DOE, rather than, you know, just sort of an ad hoc group ... The five of us decided that we have unfinished business, personally, as scientists, and we will respond to the serious comments and we will prepare a revised report". They had registered the website ClimateWorkingGroup.com for responses. Koonin hoped to hold a public debate on climate science after their work was completed.

The new report by the National Academies, published on September 17, said "the evidence for current and future harm to human health and welfare created by human-caused greenhouse gases is beyond scientific dispute." It focused on evidence gathered since the EPA’s 2009 finding, which "was accurate, has stood the test of time, and is now reinforced by even stronger evidence. Much of the understanding of climate change that was uncertain or tentative in 2009 has now been resolved by scientific research". Tilghman said the aim was to inform the EPA, "following its call for public comments, as it considers the status of the endangerment finding". The press release named the NAS fund and endowment that sponsored the study, and said the academies are "private, nonprofit institutions that provide independent, objective analysis and advice to the nation", operating under an 1863 congressional charter.

At the lawsuit hearing on September 17, judge William G. Young ruled that the CWG was subject to FACA requirements for an advisory committee, and rejected the DOE claim that it was exempt because it was ‘assembled to exchange facts or information with a Federal official". The court stated; "The conclusion of the report itself shows that it is no mere ‘review’ of the literature. To suggest otherwise borders on sophistry ... No reasonable jury could find that these words, arranged as they are, do not constitute advice or recommendations for a renewed approach to climate policy." cites On September 22, Zeldin sent an internal EPA memo to staffers about a "new, more efficient, more effective EPA", saying it was "day one of the new EPA” in a transition period to the end of November. The comment period ended that day, and 571,899 comments on the EPA draft rule had been received. With the 2025 United States federal government shutdown approaching, the administration minimized the role of career staff in rulemaking; "Rescinding the endangerment finding and all was largely not being generated by the expert staff at EPA". On October 20, the EDF asked judge Young to set a schedule for the case, but the Justice Department said that the shutdown prevented its attorneys from working. The DOE asked him to temporarily halt the lawsuit, Despite EDF concern that the administration could issue its final rule at any time, the judge granted a pause. then in a decision on 6 December required the administration to release the records by December 22.

The EPA repeal proposal was sent to the White House’s Office of Information and Regulatory Affairs (OIRA) on January 7, 2026, with meetings listed through February 10 for discussions with lobbyists. industry groups and environmental advocates. Concerns were reported about the scientific and economic analysis. and the legal requirement for responses to the public comments on the draft regarding its science-based assertions and also its legal arguments. Inadequate responses could result in the repeal failing in court.

Records of the CWG were released, showing that it met in secret at least 18 times. On 30 January, Judge Young ruled that it had contravened the FACA requirements that federal government advisory committees operate in the open, make records public, and have balanced membership; "These violations are now established as a matter of law". He rejected the defense arguments that the CWG was merely "assembled to exchange facts or information with a Federal official" or that the case was moot as the group had been disbanded, and noted that it provided policy advice and recommendations to the DOE. The lawsuit named the DOE as a defendant, but the court had found "no persuasive evidence" that they had violated FACA, and dismissed them from the case. They subsequently said they were pleased that the ruling would not prevent them from using the report or keeping it online. Gretchen Goldman of the Union of Concerned Scientists said the court had confirmed that the process for "this sham report" violated the law, and "the public deserves transparent climate policy decisions rooted in the best available science advice from credible experts".

On February 12, 2026, the Trump administration repealed the endangerment finding.

== Legal timeline ==
U.S. Supreme Court and federal court cases, actions taken by federal agencies to regulate greenhouse gases, and steps planned to complete emissions rules
Date	Action Taken	Relevant Literature
April 2007	The U.S. Supreme Court ruled in Massachusetts v. EPA that GHGs are air pollutants covered by the Clean Air Act. The EPA may regulate GHGs if they are determined to be a danger to human health.	Supreme Court Case
May 2007	President George W. Bush orders EPA to use its authority under the Clean Air Act to regulate GHGs from mobile sources, working in coordination with several other federal agencies.	Executive Order 13432
July 2009	EPA grants a Clean Air Act waiver to California to allow the state to enforce GHG fuel economy standards.	Tankersley, Jim (30 June 2009). "California wins EPA waiver on greenhouse emissions". Los Angeles Times.
October 2009	EPA issued Mandatory Reporting of Greenhouse Gases Final Rule that created the Greenhouse Gas Reporting Program (GHGRP) that requires corporations from all sectors of the economy to report GHG emissions to the EPA if above an agency-specified threshold level.	Mandatory Reporting of Greenhouse Gases Final Rule; GHGRP
December 2009	EPA issued its "Endangerment Finding," which found that current and projected levels of six GHGs threaten the health and human welfare of current and future generations.	EPA Endangerment Finding
May 2010	EPA issued its "Tailoring Rule," which limited air permitting guidelines to the largest stationary sources of GHGs, excluding smaller factories, restaurants and farms, while the National Highway Traffic Safety Administration issued the final version of the "LDV Rule" on light-duty vehicle GHG emissions standards and corporate average fuel economy standards.	EPA Tailoring Rule; LDV Rule
December 2010	EPA issued guidance to states on implementing the new GHG guidelines.	EPA Fact Sheet
January 2011	New GHG air permitting began for facilities that would have to go through air permitting for non-GHG pollutants anyway.	EPA GHG Permitting Fact Sheet
January 2011	EPA proposed a three-year deferral of GHG permitting for facilities that use biomass.	EPA Press Release
July 2011	New GHG permitting began for new facilities that would emit more than 100,000 tons of carbon dioxide equivalent per year and for facilities that will undergo major modification that would increase emissions by 75,000 tons of carbon dioxide equivalent per year	EPA Tailoring Rule Fact Sheet
July 2011	EPA finalized a three-year deferral of GHG permitting for facilities that use biomass.	EPA Biogenic Fact Sheet
September 2011	EPA will propose GHG guidelines under the "New Source Performance Standards" (NSPS), which will establish emission levels for new and existing power plants.	Power Plant Settlement Agreement
December 2011	EPA will propose GHG NSPS standards for oil refineries.	Oil Refinery Settlement Agreement
March 2012	EPA proposed carbon pollution standards for new power plants	EPA Fact Sheet
May 2012	EPA will issue final GHG standards for powerplants.	EPA Settlement Fact Sheet
June 2012	On June 26, 2012, the U.S. D.C. Circuit Court of Appeals rules in Coalition for Responsible Regulation, Inc. v. EPA upholding the Tailoring Rule and the LDV Rule.	U.S. D.C. Circuit Court ruling
November 2012	EPA will issue final GHG standards for oil refineries.	Oil Refinery Settlement Agreement
April 2015	EPA will complete study to examine GHG permitting for smaller sources of emissions.	
January 2021	On January 20, 2021, President Joe Biden issued Executive Order 13990.	Executive Order 13990
June 2022	On June 30, 2022, U.S. Supreme Court rules in West Virginia v. EPA that Congress did not grant the EPA in Section 111(d) of the Clean Air Act the authority to devise emissions caps based on the generation shifting approach the Agency took in the Clean Power Plan.	West Virginia v. EPA
August 2022	Title VI of the Inflation Reduction Act amended the Clean Air Act to include carbon dioxide, hydrofluorocarbons, methane, nitrous oxide, perfluorocarbons, and sulfur hexafluoride as air pollutants.	136 Stat. 2063, Pub. L. 117–169 (text) (PDF)
2025	On March 25, EPA administrator Lee Zeldin announced the intention to deregulate greenhouse gas emissions, and undo the endangerment finding. At an event on July 29, he released the EPA's proposals to rescind regulation, and at the same event Department of Energy Secretary Chris Wright released the draft EPA Climate Working Group report by five authors, which concluded that greenhouse gas warming "appears to be less damaging economically than commonly believed, and that aggressive mitigation strategies could be more harmful than beneficial." Additionally, U.S. policy actions were "expected to have undetectably small direct impacts on the global climate and any effects will emerge only with long delays". A short public comment period began.	
February 2026	The finding was revoked by President Trump on 12 February 2026.	

== Contributors to and consequences of climate change ==
=== Physical and social contributors to climate change ===
While there is a general consensus among the scientific community that anthropogenic GHG emissions are forcing changes in the global climate system, there is much less agreement about what should be done to address the problem because both the causes and potential solutions involve significant economic, political, and as Ingrid Kelley points out, social and cultural issues. Addressing climate change has been, and will continue to be particularly difficult for the United States because the U.S. was born during the Industrial Revolution and its growth has been powered by fossil fuels. Coal, for example, was first commercially mined in the United States in 1748, and within a few years after the ratification of the U.S. Constitution, Pittsburgh became the first industrial center in the country to use coal-fired steam power in its manufacturing operations. Electric generating plants first used pulverized coal in 1918, and that same basic method of generation is still in use today. In 2009, coal was used to produce 45% of electricity in the U.S. and that proportion is projected to remain more or less constant through 2035. Largely because of the Country's reliance on coal, electricity generation accounted for 34% of U.S. GHG emissions in 2007, followed by transportation sources (28%) and other industrial sources (19%). In 2005, the United States emitted 18% of the world's total GHG emissions, making it the second largest emitter after China. While the technology that powers our "fossil fuel culture" is part of the climate change problem, and more sustainable technologies will undoubtedly be part of the solution, another important factor in our efforts to stop climate change is the "blindness" that our economic system exhibits toward environmental degradation.

According to Al Gore, "[f]ree market capitalist economics is arguably the most powerful tool used by civilization" but it is also, "the single most powerful force behind what seem to be irrational decisions about the global environment." The force to which Gore refers draws strength from the fact that environmental amenities such as clean air and other public goods do not have a price tag and are feely shared by everyone. The lack of price mechanisms to signal the scarcity of such goods means there are no economic incentives to conserve them. In what is known as the tragedy of the commons, rational individuals are motivated to over-utilize these resources for short-term economic gain despite the potential for collective action to deplete the resource or result in other adverse consequences in the long run. What this means for GHGs is that their effects on climate stability are often disregarded in economic analyses as externalities. As a frequently used measure of a country's well-being, the GDP, for example, places value on the goods and services produced within a country but fails to account for the GHG emissions and other environmental effects created in the process. Nations are thus incentivized to utilize their resources and promote consumption at ever increasing rates despite the consequences of those actions on atmospheric concentrations of GHGs and climate stability. In this respect, the ongoing UN climate change negotiations are fundamentally about the economic future of the nations involved.

=== Greenhouse gas effect on public health and welfare ===
On December 15, 2009, EPA Administrator Lisa P. Jackson made two important findings under section 202(a) of the CAA:

1. that six greenhouse gases in the atmosphere – CO_{2}, CH_{4}, N_{2}O, hydrofluorocarbons, perfluorocarbons, and sulfur hexafluoride – may reasonably be anticipated to endanger both public health and public welfare; and
2. that GHG emissions from mobile sources covered under CAA section 202(a) contribute to the total greenhouse gas air pollution, and thus to the problem of climate change.

In the Agency's view, the body of work produced by the IPCC, the U.S. Global Change Research Program, and the National Research Council of the U.S. National Academy of Sciences represents the most comprehensive, advanced, and thoroughly reviewed documents on the science of climate change. Accordingly, the Administrator relied primarily upon assessment reports and other scientific documents produced by these entities in reaching her conclusions.

The IPCC defines "climate change" as "a change in the state of the climate that can be identified (e.g. using statistical tests) by changes in the mean and/or the variability of its properties, and that persists for an extended period, typically decades or longer. It refers to any change in climate over time, whether due to natural variability or as a result of human activity." In its latest assessment on climate change, the IPCC found that "warming of the climate system is unequivocal" and that the anthropogenic component of this warming over the last thirty years has likely had a discernible influence on observed changes in many physical and biological systems. The properties of greenhouse gases are such that they retain heat in the atmosphere, which would otherwise escape to space. GHGs accumulate in the atmosphere when they are emitted faster than they can be naturally removed, and that accumulation prompts changes in the climate system. Once emitted into the atmosphere, GHGs influence the Earth's energy balance for a period of decades to centuries. Consistent with their long-lasting impacts, the IPCC found that even if the concentrations of all GHGs had been kept constant at year 2000 levels, a further warming of approximately 0.1 °C per decade would be expected. The fact that GHGs are long-lived in the atmosphere also means that they become well mixed across the globe – hence the global nature of the problem.

After considering the scientific evidence before her, Administrator Jackson found that greenhouse gases could be reasonably anticipated to endanger the health of the U.S. population in several ways. They are:

- Direct temperature effects – Heat is the leading cause of weather-related deaths in the U.S. and severe heat waves are projected to intensify over the portions of the country where these events already occur.
- Effects on air quality – Ground level ozone (the main component of smog) can induce chest pain, coughing, throat irritation, and congestion, and it can exacerbate respiratory illnesses such as bronchitis, emphysema, and asthma.

Elevated temperatures associated with climate change are expected to intensify ground level ozone formation in polluted areas of the U.S.

- Effects on extreme weather events – The IPCC reports evidence of an increase in intense tropical cyclone activity in the North Atlantic since approximately 1970. Increases in tropical cyclone intensity are associated with increased death, injury, water- and food-borne disease, and post-traumatic stress disorder.
- Effects on climate-sensitive diseases – Expected changes in the climate will likely increase the spread of food- and water-borne pathogens among susceptible populations.

Administrator Jackson also found that GHGs could be reasonably anticipated to endanger public welfare in the following ways:

- Agriculture – While higher atmospheric CO_{2} concentrations may stimulate plant growth, climatic changes may also promote the spread of pests and weeds, increase ground level ozone formation (which is detrimental to plant life), and change temperature and precipitation patterns. Uncertainty remains about the extent to which these factors will balance each other but the evidence suggests a net disbenefit, with the potential for future crop failure.
- Forestry – As with agriculture, uncertainties remain but there is evidence of an increase in the size and occurrence of wildfires, insect outbreaks, and tree mortality in parts of the U.S. These effects are expected to continue with future changes in climate.
- Water resources – The effects of climate change on the water cycle have already been observed. For example, there is "well-documented evidence of shrinking snowpack due to warming" in the western U.S. These changes in snowfall are likely to affect areas such as California that rely on snowmelt for their water supply. Climate change is also expected to impact the water supply in other areas of the country, increasing competition for its use.
- Sea level rise – The greatest risk to the U.S. associated with sea level rise is the extent to which it will exacerbate storm-surge flooding. Areas along the Atlantic and Gulf coasts including New Orleans, Miami, and New York City are particularly vulnerable to such effects.
- Energy – Climate change is expected to increase peak electricity demand. This may further constrain water resources as power plants rely heavily on water for cooling. A large portion of U.S. energy infrastructure is located in coastal areas and may be at risk to damage from flooding.
- Ecosystems and wildlife – Changes in habitat range, timing of migration, and reproductive behavior have already been observed and are expected to increase with further warming. Ocean warming and acidification are expected to impair marine species such as corals, and the loss of arctic sea ice will reduce habitat for a number of species. Spruce-fir forests are, "likely to disappear from the contiguous United States."

== Regulatory approaches under the Clean Air Act ==
=== From mobile sources ===
==== LDV Rule (2010) ====
EPA's endangerment finding in 2009 did not impose any limitations on GHGs by itself, but was instead a prerequisite for establishing regulations for GHGs from mobile sources under CAA section 202(a). Actual emissions requirements came later on May 7, 2010, when the EPA and the National Highway Traffic Safety Administration finalized the Light-Duty Vehicle Greenhouse Gas Emission Standards and Corporate Average Fuel Economy Standards Rule (LDV Rule). The LDV Rule applies to light-duty vehicles, light-duty trucks, and medium-duty passenger vehicles (e.g., cars, sport utility vehicles, minivans, and pickup trucks used for personal transportation) for model years 2012 through 2016. The EPA estimated that this rule will prevent 960 million metric tons of CO_{2}-equivalent emissions from being emitted to the atmosphere, and that it will save 1.8 billion barrels of oil over the lifetime of the vehicles subject to the rule.

The LDV Rule accomplishes its objectives primarily through a traditional command-and-control approach. The most substantial requirements come in the form of two separate CO_{2} standards (one for cars and the other for trucks, expressed on a gram per mile basis) that apply to a manufacturer's fleet of vehicles. To determine compliance with the requirements of the rule, manufacturers must calculate a production-weighted fleet average emissions rate at the end of a model year and compare it to a fleet average emission standard. The emission standard for a manufacturer in a given model year is calculated based on the footprints of the vehicles in its fleet and the number of vehicles produced by the manufacturer at each footprint. The standards are designed so that they gradually become more stringent each year from 2012 to 2016. The LDV Rule also includes standards of 0.010 gram/mile and 0.030 gram/mile for N_{2}O and CH_{4}, respectively. These standards were primarily put in place as an anti-backsliding measure as N_{2}O and CH_{4} are already emitted from motor vehicles in relatively low amounts.

Although prescriptive regulation is among the most common policy approaches for environmental regulation, it is not without its drawbacks. Prescriptive regulations are often criticized, for example, as being overly rigid and uneconomical because they do not necessarily encourage regulated entities to reduce emissions beyond the minimum standards and they may not achieve the intended benefits at the lowest possible cost. The LDV Rule addresses these criticisms in a number of ways. First, as noted above, the emissions standards gradually become more stringent over time. This not only prevents stagnation that might occur with a single standard, it gives manufacturers sufficient lead time to adapt to the most stringent requirements. In addition, the LDV Rule includes a number of regulatory flexibilities, the most significant of which is a program that allows for banking and trading of credits. In general terms, the LDV Rule allows manufacturers to bank emissions credits in instances where their fleet average CO_{2} emissions are less than the applicable standard. Manufacturers can then use the credits themselves where certain vehicle models fall short of the standard, or they can sell the credits to another manufacturer. According to EPA, these banking and trading provisions promote the environmental objectives of the rule by addressing issues associated with technological feasibility, lead time, and cost of compliance with the standards.

==== State regulation from motor vehicles ====
With one exception, the responsibility for regulating emissions from new motor vehicles under the Clean Air Act rests with the EPA. Section 209(a) of the act states in part: "No state or any political subdivision thereof shall adopt or attempt to enforce any standard relating to the control of emissions from new motor vehicles or new motor vehicle engines subject to this part." Section 209(b) of the act provides for the exception; it grants the EPA the authority to waive this prohibition for any state that had adopted emissions standards for new motor vehicles or engines prior to March 30, 1966. California is the only state that meets this eligibility requirement and is thus the only state in the nation, which can seek to obtain a waiver from the EPA. In order to obtain a waiver and establish its own emissions requirements, the State must demonstrate, among other things, that its standards will be at least as protective as public health as any applicable federal standards. Once California obtains a waiver for a particular standard, other states may generally adopt that standard as their own.

On September 24, 2004, the California Air Resources Board (CARB) adopted emissions standards for GHGs from new passenger cars, light-duty trucks and medium-duty vehicles. Not unlike the LDV Rule, California's regulations establish standards for CO_{2} equivalent emissions from two classes of vehicles on a gram per mile basis. Also like those in the LDV Rule, California's standards become more stringent over time. CARB initially requested a waiver from EPA for these standards on December 21, 2005. EPA denied that request on March 6, 2008, stating that the State did not need the standards to address compelling and extraordinary conditions (as is required by CAA section 209(b)(1)(B)) because the effects of climate change in California were not extraordinary compared to the effects in the rest of the country. Upon reconsideration, EPA later withdrew its previous denial and approved California's waiver request on July 8, 2009. Fifteen states have adopted California's standards. Further, California and EPA have worked together so that the two programs converge and allow automakers to produce a single national fleet, which complies with both programs.

State regulations outside the Clean Air Act do affect emissions, especially gas tax rates. As of 2020, several states in the northeastern United States were discussing a regional cap and trade system for carbon emissions from motor vehicle fuel sources, called the Transportation Climate Initiative. In 2021, Massachusetts withdrew from this initiative citing as one of the reasons that it was no longer necessary.

=== From stationary sources ===
"New Source Review" (NSR) is a permitting program established by the CAA, which requires the owners or operators of "major" stationary sources of air pollution to obtain permits prior to the construction or modification of those sources. The major source NSR program has two parts:

1. the Prevention of Significant Deterioration (PSD) Program, which applies to a) sources located in areas of the country that meet the National Ambient Air Quality Standards (NAAQS), and b) to pollutants for which there are no NAAQS; and
2. the Nonattainment New Source Review (NNSR) program, which applies to sources located in areas that do not meet the NAAQS.

PSD permits are issued by EPA or a state or local government agency, depending on who has jurisdiction over the area in which the facility is located. In order to obtain a PSD permit, applicants must demonstrate that the proposed new major source, or major modification to an existing source, meets several regulatory requirements. Among those requirements are the use of the Best Available Control Technology (BACT) to limit air pollutant emissions, and a demonstration through air quality modeling that the source or modification will not cause or contribute to a violation of the NAAQS.

Under federal regulations, the PSD program applies only to sources that emit one or more "regulated NSR pollutants." In 2008, EPA Administrator Stephen Johnson issued a memorandum to document the Agency's interpretation of this regulatory text. In particular, Administrator Johnson stated that a pollutant becomes a "regulated NSR pollutant" when a provision of the act, or regulations established under the act, require actual control of that pollutant but not when the act or such regulations simply require monitoring or reporting of emissions of that pollutant. Upon request to reconsider this interpretation, EPA Administrator Lisa Jackson confirmed that that Agency would continue to apply the interpretation expressed in the 2008 memorandum but she further clarified that the time at which a pollutant becomes a "regulated NSR pollutant" is when the requirements that control emissions of the pollutant take effect, rather than upon the promulgation of those requirements. Because the LDV Rule requires vehicle manufacturers to meet applicable GHG standards for model year 2012 vehicles, and January 2, 2011, is the first day upon which model year 2012 vehicles can be introduced into commerce, the six GHGs regulated by that rule became regulated NSR pollutants as of January 2, 2011 for purposes of the PSD program.

Among the components of the PSD program, the one that primarily applies to GHGs is the requirement that source owners or operators utilize BACT to limit GHG emissions from the source. Permitting authorities generally establish BACT through a five-step analytical process, the result of which is the selection of one or more methods to reduce emissions of the pollutant in question, and the setting of one or more emission limits and operational restrictions for the emissions units undergoing review. Because the PSD program and its requirement to utilize BACT apply to any new source or modification at an existing source that meets established applicability criteria, the PSD program represents a traditional command-and-control approach to the regulation of GHGs. However, BACT is established by a permitting authority on a case-by-case basis considering site- and source-specific factors. During the course of a BACT analysis, a permitting authority may, for example, temper the stringency of the final emission limit if there are compelling adverse economic, energy, or environmental considerations.

The PSD program is complex, and obtaining a permit can be costly for both the applicant and the permitting authority. It has been estimated, for example, that permit applicants expend 866 hours of labor and $125,120 on the average PSD permit. The administrative cost to the permitting authority for the same permit is 301 hours of labor and $23,280. Traditionally, this permitting process has been focused on controlling emissions from large industrial sources of air pollution such as fossil fuel-fired power plants, petroleum refineries, and a wide range of manufacturing plants that emit more than 250 tons per year of the regulated pollutants (in some cases the applicability threshold is 100 tons per year). Prior to the regulation of GHGs under the CAA, approximately 280 such permits were issued each year. However, GHGs are generally emitted from sources in amounts far greater than other pollutants regulated under the PSD program. So much so, that sources like office buildings and large shopping malls could easily cross the 250 ton per year threshold and become subject to PSD permitting requirements. In fact, without any action to change how the PSD program is applied, the EPA estimated that as many as 41,000 sources may require permits every year with the addition of GHGs as a regulated pollutant. To prevent the unbearable administrative burdens on permitting authorities associated with such "absurd results," the EPA took action on June 3, 2010, to modify the applicability criteria in the PSD regulations. This action is known as the Prevention of Significant Deterioration and Title V Greenhouse Gas Tailoring Rule (Tailoring Rule). Through the Tailoring Rule, EPA raised the major source regulatory threshold for GHGs from the 100/250 ton per year levels to 100,000 tons per year of CO_{2} equivalent emissions.

In a 5-4 decision authored by Justice Scalia in 2014, the Supreme Court remanded the Tailoring Rule to EPA on the grounds that the Clean Air Act did not authorize the agency to regulate all the sources encompassed by the Rule. The Court determined that EPA could only require the "anyway" sources – those that participated in the PSD program because of their emissions of non-GHG pollutants—the comply with PSD program and Title V permitting requirements for GHGs. This effectively excluded the "Step 2" sources identified in the final rule.

== Suitability of the Clean Air Act ==
Because the LDV Rule and the application of the PSD program to GHGs took effect only recently, it is too soon to assess by how much they have reduced actual GHG emissions and at what cost. However, given the tremendous implications that regulation of GHGs has for almost every aspect of our society, it should not be surprising that much has already been written about the adequacy of the CAA for regulating global pollutants. It should also be no surprise that opinions on this question are widely varied. Allen and Lewis, for example, contended in 2010 that the CAA is wholly unsuitable for regulating GHGs because it was not designed to do so and the costs of such regulation potentially far exceed the costs associated with climate change legislation recently considered in Congress. As support for their argument that the CAA is a poor fit for GHGs, they point to the "absurd results" that EPA itself acknowledged and sought to avoid through passage of the Tailoring Rule:

"EPA is entirely correct: Congress did not intend to apply PSD and Title V to small entities, did not intend for those programs to crash under their own weight, and did not intend for PSD to stifle economic growth. [footnote omitted] And Congress never intended for EPA to control CO_{2} emissions under the CAA! [footnote omitted] Congressional support for regulatory climate policy is much stronger today than it was in 1970 and 1977, when Congress enacted and amended CAA section 202. [footnote omitted] Yet even today, the prospects for cap-and-trade legislation and for U.S. ratification of a successor treaty to the Kyoto Protocol remain in doubt. [footnote omitted] The notion that Congress, in 1970 or 1977, implicitly authorized EPA to adopt economy-wide, or even industry-specific, controls on CO_{2} is ludicrously unfounded. [footnote omitted]"

Economists Dallas Burtraw and Arthur G. Fraas with the nonprofit and nonpartisan research organization Resources for the Future offered a different perspective in 2011 on the subject of GHG regulation under the CAA. Although they agree that new legislation specifically designed to address climate change is the best long-term option, they characterize the CAA as a, "potentially potent alternative" in the absence of such legislation for the short-term. They note, for example, that EPA has already identified improvements in energy efficiency as the most attractive short-term option for mitigating GHGs at existing facilities in many industrial sectors. They go on to state that such improvements would most likely be among the first moves made by regulated entities under a legislative approach so it is unlikely that requiring these moves through regulation would result in comparatively higher costs. Based on their research, they conclude that domestic GHG reductions of up to 10% relative to 2005 levels could be achieved at moderate costs, which is comparable to reductions that would have been achieved under the Waxman-Markey climate change bill that was passed by the House of Representatives in 2009. In their view, the success of regulating GHGs under the CAA as it exists today rests with the EPA:

"We see substantial opportunities under the Clean Air Act for domestic emissions reductions that can be achieved at what will probably be moderate cost. However, enthusiasm about the act as a vehicle for carbon regulation should be tempered. First, this paper suggests that achieving meaningful emissions benefits at reasonable cost is possible, but it will require EPA to be bold. The agency must interpret sections of the act to enable use of flexible mechanisms, must be ambitious in setting emissions targets, and must shift its focus to a new regulatory program. In short, to do all of this well, the agency will need to innovate ... Second, EPA action under the CAA is inferior to new legislation from Congress, especially over the long term. Although it is possible to identify some readily available opportunities for emissions reductions and push them via regulation (with market tools to keep costs down), it quickly becomes difficult to identify what steps should be taken next ... With those reservations, however, the Clean Air Act—if used wisely by EPA—can be a useful vehicle for short-term greenhouse gas regulation."

== Influence of stakeholders ==
Because EPA's authority to regulate GHG emissions has such significant implications for the economy, the environment, and society at large, it is a topic of interest to a broad range of organizations including Congress, the courts, the states, environmental organizations, and the regulated industry. All of these entities have had a direct hand in shaping the laws, regulations, and policies concerning GHGs into what they are today and will likely continue to do so in the future. As discussed above, California has played a large role in shaping the motor vehicle regulations. EPA's authority to regulate GHGs under the CAA is also a topic of continuing political debate in both chambers of Congress. On January 21, 2010, Senator Lisa Murkowski (R-AK) introduced a disapproval resolution under the Congressional Review Act, which would have nullified EPA's endangerment finding. The resolution was defeated by a vote of 53–47, with six Democrats voting in favor of it. Later that year on March 4, Senator Jay Rockefeller (D-WV) introduced a bill that would suspend for two years any EPA action to regulate CO_{2} or CH_{4} under the CAA except for the vehicle standards under section 202. He re-introduced similar legislation on January 31, 2011, the same day Senator John Barrasso (R-WY) introduced broad legislation to preempt regulation of GHGs under federal law. On February 2, 2011, Representative Fred Upton (R-MI), Representative Ed Whitfield (R-KY), and Senator James Inhofe (R-OK) released a draft bill, which would amend the CAA to, "prohibit the Administrator of the Environmental Protection Agency from promulgating any regulation concerning, taking action relating to, or taking into consideration the emission of a greenhouse gas due to concerns regarding possible climate change, and for other purposes."

That the major opposition to regulation of GHGs under the CAA is headed largely by a contingent of elected officials from major coal, oil, and gas states exemplifies the political warfare that can erupt when leaders attempt to appeal to their core constituencies even though doing so may impede action on pressing national problems. It also underscores Al Gore's view that the political system will be the "decisive factor" in our efforts to address global climate change: "the real work must be done by individuals, and politicians need to assist citizens in their efforts to make new and necessary choices." Whether Congress will act any time soon to pass cap-and-trade legislation or revoke EPA's authority to regulate GHGs is questionable. However, even inaction by Congress in this area leaves EPA's future options open.

In his book Earth in the Balance, Al Gore observes that, "the American people often give their leaders permission to take action [on an issue] by signaling agreement in principle while reserving the right to object strenuously to each and every specific sacrifice necessary to follow through." In one 2010 study by the Stanford Woods Institute for the Environment, 1,000 people were asked the question: "How important is the issue of global warming to you personally?" 76% of respondents said they considered global warming to be extremely important, very important, or somewhat important. 68% of people in the same survey also said that the United States should take action on global warming even if other major industrial countries such as China and India do not agree to do equally effective things. When asked, "[P]lease tell me whether you favor or oppose the federal government ...[increasing] taxes on gasoline so people either drive less, or buy cars that use less gas," 71% of the survey respondents said they opposed increased gasoline taxes.

In his 1998 article, "Learning to Live with NGOs," P.J. Simmons wrote that NGOs can, "make the impossible possible by doing what governments cannot or will not." History shows that this is particularly true where climate change regulation is concerned. While NGOs cannot themselves pass climate change regulations, they have played a clear role in forcing EPA's hand through action in the courts. EPA's endangerment finding, the LDV Rule, and the consequent regulation of GHGs from stationary sources under the PSD program are a direct result of the Supreme Court's decision in Massachusetts v. EPA. As discussed supra, that case is founded on the petition submitted to EPA in 1999 by the International Center for Technology Assessment and nineteen other NGOs. With passage of the LDV Rule, EPA did what ICTA and its fellow petitioners demanded more than ten years earlier. And a number of NGOs have continued to apply pressure to EPA. On December 23, 2010, EPA announced that it would establish GHG standards for new and modified electric generating units (EGUs) and petroleum refineries under section 111(b) of the CAA, and that it would set GHG emissions guidelines for existing sources in those same categories under CAA section 111(d); these emissions standards and guidelines will be established according to a schedule set forth in settlement agreements into which EPA entered to settle legal challenges brought forth by several NGOs and states after EPA failed to establish GHG standards when it revised its rules for EGUs and refineries in 2006 and 2008. Under the terms of the agreement, EPA will issue final standards for EGUs and refineries in May 2012 and November 2012, respectively.

As of 2010, EPA's actions to address climate change were also being challenged by the regulated community. Over eighty claims have been filed by thirty-five different petitioners against EPA related to the endangerment finding, the LDV Rule, the Tailoring Rule, and another rule related to the PSD program. A large number of the parties in these cases are businesses and industry associations (acting in the interests of businesses) such as Peabody Energy Company, Gerdau Ameristeel U.S. Inc., Coalition for Responsible Regulation, National Association of Manufacturers, Portland Cement Association, National Mining Association, American Farm Bureau Association, and the U.S. Chamber of Commerce. These claims have been consolidated into Coalition for Responsible Regulation v. U.S. Environmental Protection Agency (CRR v. EPA) under three main docket numbers, 09–1322, 10–1092, and 10–1073. The arguments put forth by the plaintiffs are numerous and varied, depending on the particular case but most are fundamentally about the economic impacts of regulation. A summary of the arguments has been compiled by Gregory Wannier of The Center for Climate Change Law at the Columbia Law School. On June 26, 2012, the Court of Appeals for the District of Columbia Circuit issued an opinion in CRR v. EPA which dismissed the challenges in these cases to the EPA's endangerment finding and the related GHG regulations. The three-judge panel unanimously upheld the EPA's central finding that GHG such as carbon dioxide endanger public health and were likely responsible for the global warming experienced over the past half century.

== See also ==
- Climate change policy of the United States
- Climate change in the United States
- Environmental policy of the second Donald Trump administration
