= Quasi-biennial oscillation =

Tropical wind alternation

The quasi-biennial oscillation (QBO) is a quasiperiodic oscillation of the equatorial zonal wind between easterlies and westerlies in the tropical stratosphere with a mean period of 28 to 29 months. The alternating wind regimes develop at the top of the lower stratosphere and propagate downwards at about 1 km (0.6 mi) per month until they are dissipated at the tropopause. Downward motion of the easterlies is usually more irregular than that of the westerlies. The amplitude of the easterly phase is about twice as strong as that of the westerly phase. At the top of the vertical QBO domain, easterlies dominate, while at the bottom, westerlies are more likely to be found. At the 30 mb level, with regard to monthly mean zonal winds, the strongest recorded easterly was 29.55 m/s in November 2005, while the strongest recorded westerly was only 15.62 m/s in June 1995.

== Early observations ==
In 1883, the eruption of Krakatoa led to visual tracking of subsequent volcanic ash in the stratosphere. This visual tracking led to the discovery of easterly winds between 25 and 30 km above the surface. The winds were then called the Krakatau easterlies. In 1908, data balloons launched above Lake Victoria in Africa recorded westerly winds in the stratospheric levels of the atmosphere. These findings, at the time, were thought to contradict the 1883 findings. However, the winds that would become known as the QBO were discovered to oscillate between westerly and easterly in the 1950s by researchers at the UK Meteorological Office. The cause of these QBO winds remained unclear for some time. Radiosonde soundings showed that its phase was not related to the annual cycle, as is the case for many other stratospheric circulation patterns.

== Theory ==
In the 1970s it was recognized by Richard Lindzen and James Holton that the periodic wind reversal was driven by atmospheric waves emanating from the tropical troposphere that travel upwards and are dissipated in the stratosphere by radiative cooling. The precise nature of the waves responsible for this effect was heavily debated; in recent years, however, gravity waves have come to be seen as a major contributor and the QBO is now simulated in a growing number of climate models.

== Effects ==
Effects of the QBO include mixing of stratospheric ozone by the secondary circulation caused by the QBO, modification of monsoon precipitation, and an influence on stratospheric circulation in Northern Hemisphere winter (mediated partly by a change in the frequency of sudden stratospheric warmings). Easterly phases of the QBO often coincide with more sudden stratospheric warmings, a weaker Atlantic jet stream, and cold winters in Northern Europe and the Eastern U.S. In contrast, westerly phases of the QBO often coincide with mild winters in the Eastern U.S. and a strong Atlantic jet stream with mild, wet winters in Northern Europe. In addition, the QBO has been shown to affect hurricane frequency during hurricane seasons in the Atlantic. Research has also been conducted investigating a possible relationship between ENSO (El Niño–Southern Oscillation) and the QBO.

== Observation of the QBO with weather balloons ==
The Free University of Berlin supplies a QBO data set that comprises radiosonde observations from Canton Island, Gan, and Singapore. The plot below shows the QBO during the 1980s.

Time–height plot of monthly-mean, zonal-mean equatorial zonal wind (u) in m/s between about 20 and 35 km (22 mi) altitude above sea level over a ten-year period. Positive values denote westerly winds and the contour line is at 0 m/s.

== Recent observations ==
The first significant observed deviation from the normal QBO since its discovery in early 1950s was noted beginning in February 2016, when the transition to easterly winds was disrupted by a new band of westerly winds that formed unexpectedly. The lack of a reliable QBO cycle deprives forecasters of a valuable tool. Since the QBO has a strong influence on the North Atlantic Oscillation and thereby north European weather, scientists speculated that the coming winter could be warmer and stormier in that region. NASA scientists have been researching to test if the extremely strong 2014–2016 El Niño, climate change, or some other factor might be involved. They are trying to determine whether this is more of a once-in-a-generation event or a sign of the changing climate.

== See also ==
- Climate variability and change § Oscillations and cycles
