= Iris hypothesis =

Hypothesis regarding infrared radiation leakage

The iris hypothesis was a hypothesis proposed by Richard Lindzen and colleagues in 2001 that suggested increased sea surface temperature in the tropics would result in reduced cirrus clouds and thus more infrared radiation leakage from Earth's atmosphere. His study of observed changes in cloud coverage and modeled effects on infrared radiation released to space as a result seemed to support the hypothesis. This suggested infrared radiation leakage was hypothesized to be a negative feedback in which an initial warming would result in an overall cooling of the surface.

The idea of the iris effect of cirrus clouds in trapping outgoing radiation was reasonable, but it ignored the larger compensating effect on the blocking of incoming sun's rays, and effects of changes in altitude of clouds. Moreover, a number of errors were found in the papers. For this reason, the iris effect no longer plays a role in the current scientific consensus on climate change.

== Scientific discussion ==
Scientists subsequently tested the hypothesis. Some concluded that there was no evidence supporting the hypothesis. Others found evidence suggesting that increased sea surface temperature (SST) in the tropics did indeed reduce cirrus clouds but found that the effect was nonetheless a positive climate feedback rather than the negative feedback that Lindzen had hypothesized.

A later 2007 study conducted by Roy Spencer et al. using updated satellite data potentially supported the iris hypothesis. In 2011, Lindzen published another paper on this topic. This work has been described as "gravely flawed and its results wrong on multiple fronts. Their choice of observational periods distorted the results and underscored the defective nature of their analysis."

In his memoirs in 2023, Kevin E. Trenberth rebutted the Iris hypothesis in strong words:

"On the science front, Lindzen made great waves with a widely touted paper on possibilities that might nullify global warming (Lindzen et al. 2001) hyping an iris effect that would allow more longwave radiation escape to space as more widespread subsidence occurred as a consequence of stronger convection with increased heating. The idea of the iris effect was reasonable in of itself, but it focused only on the role of the areal extent of tropical cirrus on the outgoing infrared radiation, with no accounting for the huge and largely compensating effects on incoming solar radiation, or changes in altitude. In terms of SST (sea surface temperature) response, the solar effects are greater!"

In other words, Trenberth said that the concept itself was not necessarily wrong but very much incomplete. Furthermore, he pointed out that Lindzen's papers on this topic had substantial errors in them.

In 2015, a paper was published which again suggested the possibility of an "Iris Effect". It also proposed what it called a "plausible physical mechanism for an iris effect." In 2017, a paper was published which found that "tropical anvil cirrus clouds exert a negative climate feedback in strong association with precipitation efficiency".

== See also ==
- Climate change
- Fixed anvil temperature hypothesis
- Global dimming
