= Judith Curry =

American climatologist and climate change skeptic (born c. 1953)

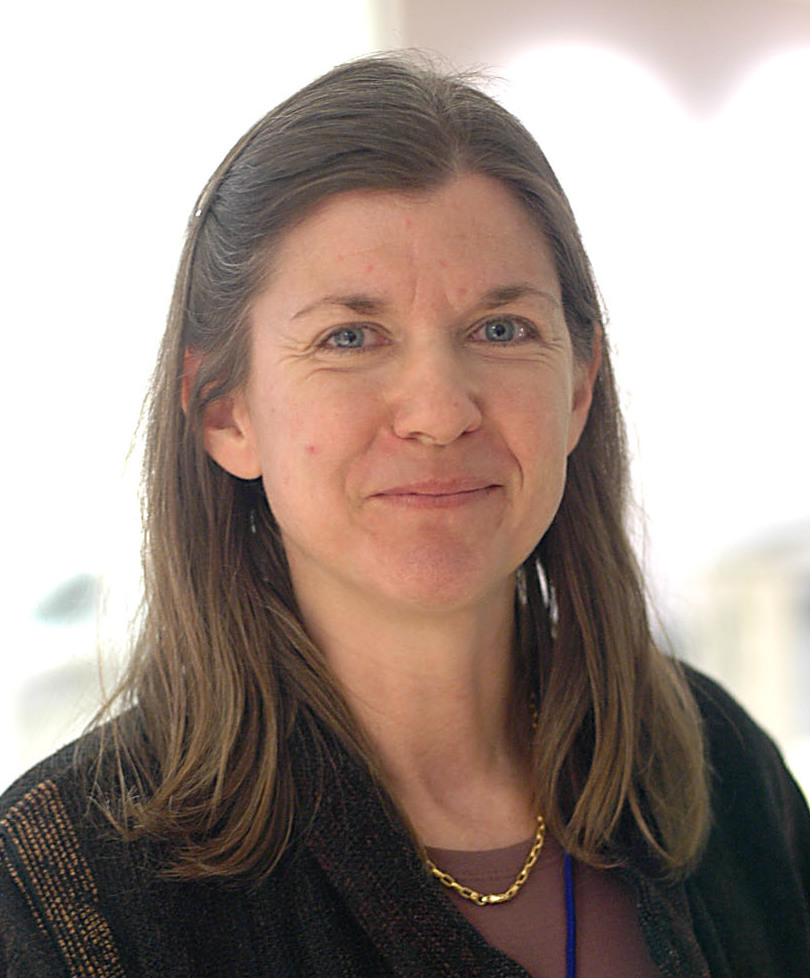
- Curry in 2006
- Born: Judith A. Curry c. 1953 (age 72–73); United States
- Education: Northern Illinois University (B.S.); University of Chicago (Ph.D.)
- Occupation: Climatologist
- Scientific career
- Workplaces: School of Earth and Atmospheric Sciences, Georgia Institute of Technology
- Thesis: The Formation of Continental Polar Air (1982)
- Website: Curry's home page; Curry's blog

Judith A. Curry (born c. 1953) is an American climatologist and former chair of the School of Earth and Atmospheric Sciences at the Georgia Institute of Technology. Her research interests include hurricanes, remote sensing, atmospheric modeling, polar climates, air-sea interactions, climate models, and the use of unmanned aerial vehicles for atmospheric research. She was a member of the National Research Council's Climate Research Committee, published over a hundred scientific papers, and co-edited several major works. Curry retired from academia in 2017.

Curry has become known for hosting a blog which is part of the climate change denial blogosphere. Social scientists who have studied Curry's position on climate change have described it as "neo-skepticism", in that her current position includes certain features of denialism; on the one hand, she accepts that the planet is warming, that human-generated greenhouse gases like carbon dioxide cause warming, and that the plausible worst-case scenario is potentially catastrophic, but on the other hand she also proposes that the rate of warming is slower than climate models have projected, emphasizes her evaluation of the uncertainty in the climate projection models, and questions whether climate change mitigation is affordable. In 2013 Curry testified to the United States Congress that, in her opinion, there is so much uncertainty about natural climate variation that trying to reduce emissions may be pointless.

== Education ==
Curry graduated cum laude from Northern Illinois University with a B.S. degree in geography in 1974. She earned her Ph.D. in geophysical sciences from the University of Chicago in 1982.

== Career ==
Curry is a Professor Emeritus and former Chair of the School of Earth and Atmospheric Sciences at the Georgia Institute of Technology; she held the latter position from 2002 to 2013. Curry retired from her university position in 2017, describing part of her reason for leaving academia was what she described as "anti-skeptic bias", which she described at the time as the "craziness" of the political nature of climate science. Curry served on NASA Advisory Council Earth Science Subcommittee whose mission was to provide advice and recommendations to NASA on issues of program priorities and policy. She was a member of the NOAA Climate Working Group from 2004 to 2009, a member of the National Academies Space Studies Board from 2004 to 2007, and a member of the National Academies Climate Research Group from 2003 to 2006.

Before moving to Georgia, Curry was professor of Atmospheric and Oceanic Sciences at the University of Colorado-Boulder, and had previously held faculty positions at Penn State University, Purdue, and the University of Wisconsin-Madison. Curry was active in researching possible connections between hurricane intensity and global warming. Her research group did research linking the size of hurricanes and resulting damage that showed that, among other things, the size of the hurricanes was an important factor in determining the number of tornadoes spawned by the system. Among her awards is the Henry G. Houghton Research Award from the American Meteorological Society in 1992, and a Presidential Young Investigator Award from the National Science Foundation in 1988.

Curry retired in 2017 from her tenured position as a professor at the School of Earth and Atmospheric Sciences at the Georgia Institute of Technology at age 63, because of what she called "the poisonous nature of the scientific discussion around human-caused global warming". Michael Mann said climate science would be stronger without her because of her "confusionism and denialism". In an interview with eenews.net at the time of her retirement, she argued for more focus on reducing climate change vulnerabilities. After leaving academia, Curry shifted to running the Climate Forecast Applications Network, a climate-risk consulting company whose clients include federal agencies, insurance companies, and energy companies.

== Views on climate change ==
In his 2010 profile on Curry, journalist Michael Lemonick reported that Curry began paying attention to outsider climate blogs after they attacked a 2005 paper she co-authored, which related increasing hurricane strength to global warming. Rather than dismissing their comments, she had discussions with critics, including Christopher Landsea and Patrick Michaels. She began participating in outsider blogs, such as Climate Audit, where she found the discussions very interesting, as opposed to "preaching to the converted" at mainstream climate science blog RealClimate. Despite the amount of what she describes as "crankology", she thought the time was well spent to avoid groupthink.

Curry had previously accepted Intergovernmental Panel on Climate Change (IPCC) reports. In the 2010 profile, she accused the IPCC of "corruption" and said she no longer had confidence in the process. She agreed that the Earth is warming, largely due to human-generated greenhouse gases such as carbon dioxide, and that the plausible worst-case scenario is potentially catastrophic. She said that the IPCC was distorting the science and scientists were not dealing adequately with uncertainties. (Note: Compare with her 2011 co-authored paper, "Climate Science and the Uncertainty Monster". Hegerl et al. disputed this by pointing out four "key errors" in the paper. Curry and Webster responded, insisting that their critique remained valid.) Commenting climatologists have generally disagreed with her critiques. Stephen Schneider, who had persuaded the IPCC to systematize discussion of uncertainty, said Curry had lately proposed "a lot of strawmen" and "It is frankly shocking to see such a good scientist take that kind of a turn to sloppy thinking. I have no explanation for it." Curry felt that although she was still able to publish professionally, she had become a victim of mainstream climate science's overreaction to criticism; she believed the climate community had adopted a fortress mentality, defending insiders and refusing access to outsiders.

Curry began her own blog open to outsider participation. It was described as part of the climate change denial blogosphere in the 2015 Oxford University Press book Climate Change and Society: Sociological Perspectives. That same year, Curry was described by InsideClimate News as "relatively new to the denialist camp". She was included on an e-mail sent by Fred Singer, who was concerned over the possible fallout from the documentary film Merchants of Doubt.

Curry's position on climate change was much criticized by climate scientists, and she became known as a contrarian scientist. A 2013 Media Matters for America study found that Curry was among the "climate doubters" most frequently quoted by the press as spreading public doubts about climate science. Going against the vast majority view of climate scientists, she had suggested to newspapers that most of the recent global warming was not human-caused, and had hinted that IPCC scientists are motivated by "funding" even though they are not paid for their contributions. She consistently presents her view that climate science has much larger uncertainties than those shown by mainstream studies, though she has not shown any previously unconsidered cause for such uncertainty. A 2019 article in Human Ecology Review described her position as a form of climate denialism, criticizing her downplaying of potential future climate change effects and emphasis on the costs of addressing climate change.

== Political influence ==
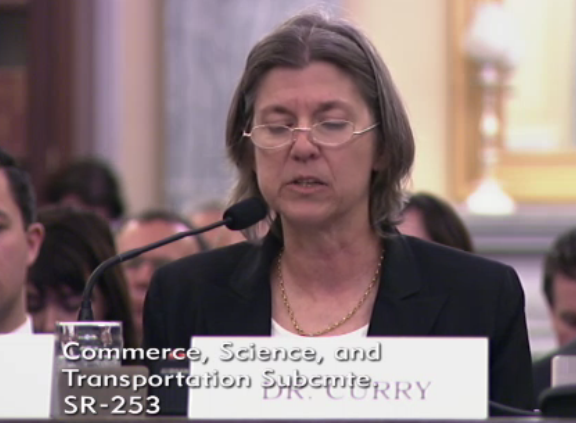
Judith Curry testimony at the Subcommittee on Space, Science, and Competitiveness on December 8, 2015

Curry has repeatedly been invited as a witness to United States Congressional hearings as one of the few scientists advancing doubts about the significance of human contributions to climate change, and political figures have used Curry's statements and writings in their arguments. For instance, when Christopher Shank, a politician and President Trump's first appointment to the NASA transition team, questioned the role of humans in climate change, Shank referred to Curry's work and her site's URL repeatedly in his testimony.

Between 2014 and February 2019, Curry testified before at least six Republican-led House committees, expressing the idea that the dangers of global warming are overstated and difficult to predict. These testimonies include criticisms of President Obama's climate plan, the UN climate action plan, and other policy proposals aimed at reducing carbon dioxide emissions. In her Natural Resources Committee testimony on February 6, 2019, Curry stated that, "Man-made climate change is not an existential threat in the 21st century.... The perception of a near-term apocalypse has narrowed the policy options".

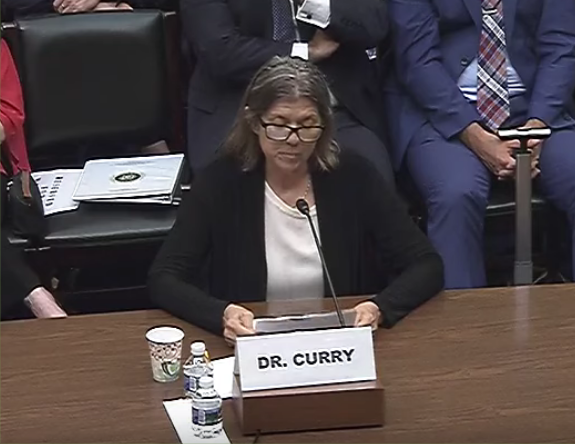
Judith Curry at the June 25, 2019 hearing of the U.S. Committee on Ovesight and Reform in a meeting on Recovery, Resiliency and Readiness—Contending with Natural Disasters in the Wake of Climate Change

In February 2019, Curry was on a Trump administration candidate list for a "Presidential Committee on Climate Security" to perform an "adversarial scientific peer review" of climate science. The administration offered Curry a senior position at the NOAA in late 2020, which Curry declined.

== Publications ==
Curry co-authored Thermodynamics of Atmospheres and Oceans (1999), and co-edited Encyclopedia of Atmospheric Sciences (2002). She has published over 130 scientific peer-reviewed papers.

In February 2010 Curry published the essay "On the Credibility of Climate Change, Towards Rebuilding Trust" on Watts Up With That? and other blogs.

In November 2018, Curry submitted for publication a report on sea level rise titled Sea Level and Climate Change in which she argues against the scientific community's consensus. She presents a case that sea level rise has been a "slow creep" over the last 150 years and has been unaffected by anthropogenic climate change. Though these arguments place her outside the academic consensus, Curry said that her findings were compatible with those presented by the Intergovernmental Panel on Climate Change. An Associated Press article suggested that Curry's arguments could dampen moves by cities and municipalities to start lawsuits against oil-and-gas companies seeking recompense for anticipated sea level rise damages.

In 2025, Curry was appointed a member of the United States Department of Energy's newly-formed Climate Working Group along with scientists John Christy, Steven E. Koonin, Ross McKitrick, and Roy Spencer, all of whom are known for promoting contrary views of climate change. In July 2025, the group released A Critical Review of Impacts of Greenhouse Gas Emissions on the US Climate, which argues that rising CO_{2} "appears to be less damaging economically than commonly believed, and that aggressive mitigation strategies could be more harmful than beneficial." An international group of 85 scientists led by climate scientists Andrew Dessler and Robert Kopp wrote a 434-page rebuttal entitled Climate Experts' Review of the DOE Climate Working Group Report, criticizing it for lacking peer review, cherry-picking evidence, misinterpreting citations, and having a predetermined outcome.

Books by Curry

- Curry, Judith A.; Webster, Peter J. (1999). Thermodynamics of Atmospheres and Oceans. Academic Press. ISBN 978-0-12199-570-6.
- James R. Holton, Judith A. Curry and John A. Pyle (dir. (2003). Encyclopedia of Atmospheric Sciences, 6 volumes. Academic Press. ISBN 978-0-12227-090-1.
- Thermodynamics, Kinetics, and Microphysics of Clouds. Cambridge University Press. 2014. ISBN 978-1-10701-603-3.
- Climate Uncertainty and Risk: Rethinking Our Response, Anthem Press, 2023. ISBN 978-1-78527-816-7 and ISBN 978-1-83998-925-4

== Honours and awards ==
- 1988: Presidential Young Investigator Award, National Science Foundation
- 1992: Henry G. Houghton Award, American Meteorological Society
- 1995: Fellow, American Meteorological Society
- 1997: Elected to Council of American Meteorological Society
- 2002: Green Faculty Award, University of Colorado
- 2002: Group Achievement Award for Convection and Moisture Experiment 4, NASA
- 2004: Fellow, American Geophysical Union
- 2006: Best Faculty Paper Award, Georgia Tech, Sigma Xi
- 2007: Fellow, American Association for the Advancement of Science
- 2011: Graetzinger Moving School Forward Award, Georgia Tech
- 2017: Top 50 Women in STEM – Best Schools

== See also ==
- All models are wrong
- Scientific consensus on climate change
