= Climate Forecast Applications Network =

Developer of weather and climate forecast tools and services provider

- Founded: 2006; 20 years ago
- Founder: Judith Curry; Peter Webster
- Headquarters: Reno, NV, United States
- Website: cfanclimate.net

Climate Forecast Applications Network (CFAN) is a company that develops weather and climate forecast tools and provides research and consulting services to manage weather and climate risks. CFAN was started in 2006 by Judith Curry and Peter Webster in Georgia Tech’s Enterprise Innovation Institute VentureLab program.

== Background ==
Climate Forecast Applications in Bangladesh was among CFAN's first projects. In 1998, 60% of Bangladesh had floods for over three months as the Brahmaputra River and Ganges flooded simultaneously. CFAN developed a 1 to 10 day hydrologic forecast model in 2000, and the model became operational in 2003. The Bangkok, Thailand-based Regional Integrated Multi-Hazard Early Warning System (RIMES) continues use of the model for Bangladesh. Following three years of summer floods in Pakistan, a model was developed for the Indus Valley but has not been used by Pakistan authorities. CFAN has continued to call for improved weather forecasts for South Asia, particularly following Cyclone Nargis's effect on Myanmar and the storm surge from Super Typhoon Haiyan.

== Reception ==
In Global Flood Hazard: Applications in Modeling, Mapping, and Forecasting, CFAN was called a "notable example" for flood early warning processes, and their system was praised for effectiveness and cost. Their probabilistic forecasts are made available online for customers and can be used for operational and disaster management. In Reducing Disaster: Early Warning Systems For Climate Change, CFAN is cited as an example of "strong institutional networking and commitments" that have facilitated development of flood forecasting schemes and their application, at the international level. In Flood Forecasting: A Global Perspective CFAN's Bangladesh flood timing and flood risk predictions for the Brahmaputra River were characterized as "skillful" despite the "considerable overestimation or underestimation of peak magnitudes", with predictions for the Ganges being "less skillful".
