= A Critical Review of Impacts of Greenhouse Gas Emissions on the U.S. Climate =

2025 U.S. Department of Energy report on climate change

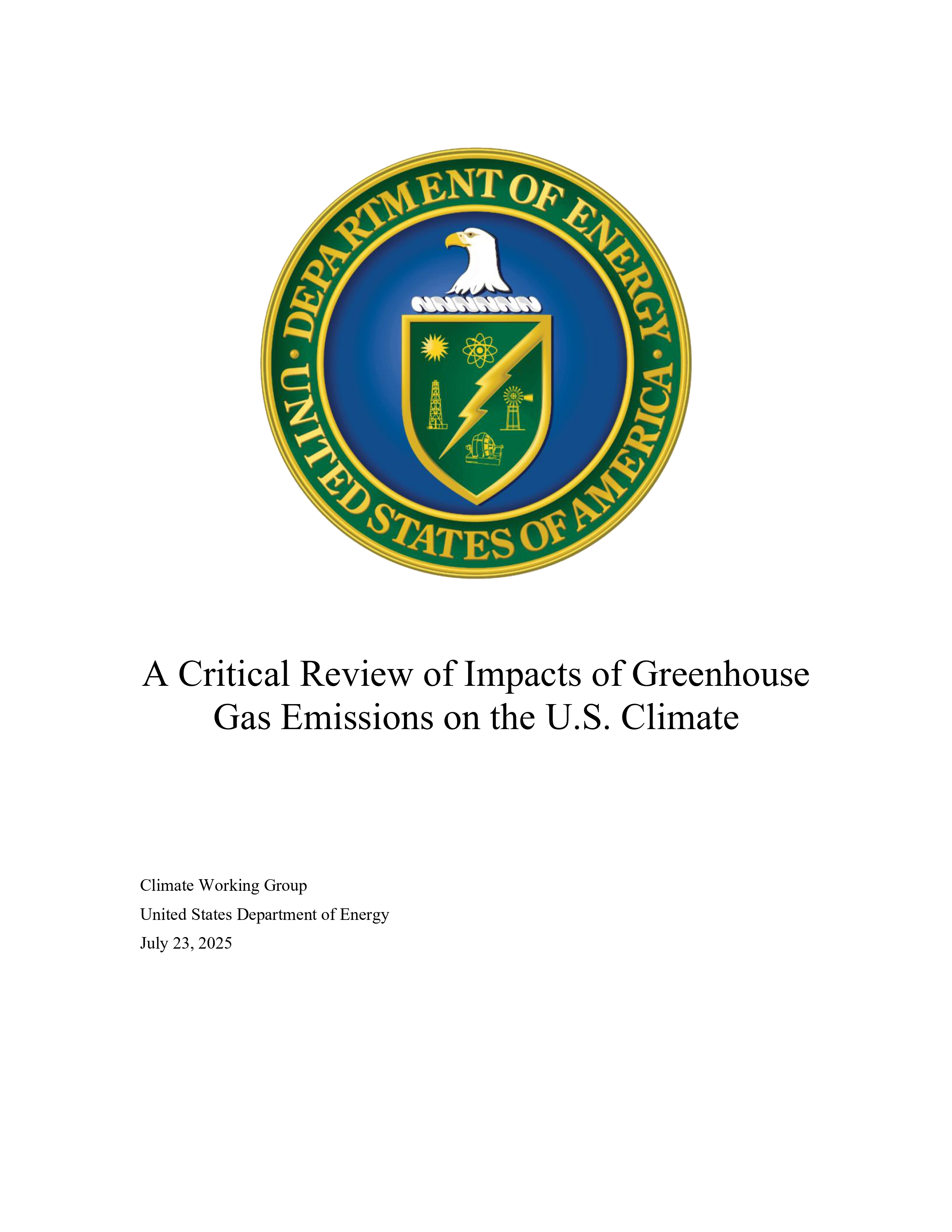
- Presented: July 23, 2025; 15 months ago

Official website
- A Critical Review of Impacts of Greenhouse Gas Emissions on the U.S. Climate at the Wayback Machine (archived August 1, 2025)

A Critical Review of Impacts of Greenhouse Gas Emissions on the U.S. Climate is a draft report by the U.S. Department of Energy released in July 2025 that challenges the scientific consensus on human-caused climate change. Written by a five-member "Climate Working Group" (CWG) assembled by the Trump administration, the report has been widely criticized by mainstream climate scientists for failing to meet accepted standards of scientific quality and objectivity. The report's lead author is John Christy, with contributors Judith Curry, Roy Spencer, Stevin Koonin, and Ross McKitrick, all of whom are known for promoting contrary views of climate change. The report argues that rising CO_{2} "appears to be less damaging economically than commonly believed, and that aggressive mitigation strategies could be more harmful than beneficial." An international group of 85 scientists led by climate scientists Andrew Dessler and Robert Kopp wrote a 434-page rebuttal entitled Climate Experts' Review of the DOE Climate Working Group Report which said that the report contains numerous instances of cherry-picking data, misstating the conclusions of its citations, and that its purpose is political, not scientific.

== Background ==
The report is a continuation of the Trump administration's campaigns against government-funded science and environmental policy. According to a report by Columbia University, as of early September 2025, there were 200 instances of Trump rolling back climate-related policies and regulations, compared to about 125 over his entire first term. Earlier that year, the administration fired about 400 scientists working on the sixth National Climate Assessment, and shut down the website hosting previous assessments—which have historically been consistent with the international consensus view. Other recent actions included withdrawing the U.S. from the Paris climate agreement, and expanding oil and gas production while halting clean energy projects already funded and under construction. The administration was also working to block state laws and regulations designed to mitigate climate change.

On the same day the DOE report was released, the chief administrator of the US Environmental Protection Agency announced that the Trump administration would rescind the 2009 Endangerment Finding, which concluded that planet-warming greenhouse gases pose a threat to public health. The endangerment finding is the scientific determination that underpins the U.S. government's legal authority to combat climate change. EPA administrator Lee Zeldin announced plans to eliminate over 30 regulations related to emissions, saying, "We are driving a dagger straight into the heart of the climate change religion." DOE spokesperson Ben Dietderich sad that president Trump has "not pre-judged how [the DOE] report will impact the EPA's proposed Endangerment Finding."

In a DOE letter dated September 3, Wright wrote to the five Climate Working Group researchers; "Having collided with so many orthodoxies, I'm confident that we've excited the much-needed debate in this area and can dissolve the Climate Working Group", adding "It is unsurprising that we are now facing yet another effort to declare the science 'settled' and to shut down this debate." He said the "resulting debate it invited exceeded my expectations", and "The discourse around this issue will benefit from your work and the public comment process; both create long overdue space for a variety of scientific viewpoints". A DOE spokesperson said "DOE determined that the draft report and the public comments it solicited achieved the purpose of the CWG, namely to catalyze broader discussion about the certainties and uncertainties of current climate science". DOE will not withdraw the report; "We will continue to engage in the debate in favor of a more science-based and less ideological conversation around climate science".

== Report ==
The report's authors were chosen by Chris Wright in his role as the United States Secretary of Energy. Over the past several decades, the authors have actively promoted contrary views that cast doubt on evidence for a strong greenhouse effect, thereby minimizing the dangers of rising greenhouse gas emissions. The report argues that efforts to mitigate climate change are likely more harmful to society now than the future hazards they aim to reduce. It also claims, contrary to projections by the Intergovernmental Panel on Climate Change (IPCC), that warming response to emissions will likely be modest and perhaps even beneficial, saying that there had been little trend in environmental disasters, negligible economic impacts and benefits to plant growth due to higher levels of CO_{2}.

However, a 434-page rebuttal published by 85 climate scientists said that human-caused climate change is causing more heat waves, heavy rainfall events, droughts, hurricanes, and wildfires, and that the DOE CWG report understates health risks associated with climate change, wrongly states that models overestimate warming, and downplays relationship between warming and wildfires. The rebuttal also criticized the DOE CWG report for having taken only four months to write with no external peer review, with about 11% of the report's citations being written by its own five authors. They negatively compared it to the 2023 IPCC Sixth Assessment Report which was authored by 230 scientists over the course of several years, with a self-citation rate of only about 2%, and only published after "multiple rounds of internal and external review."

DOE secretary Chris Wright said that the report's authors were not directed what to include in the report, and that its goal was to "restore confidence in science, in data, in rationalism". He was critical of past administrations for what he described as an "Orwellian squelching of science". DOE spokesperson Ben Dietderich echoed Wright's sentiments, adding that the president's goal was to have "a more thoughtful and science-based conversation".

== Reception by scientists ==
The report was broadly condemned by the scientific community.

An international group of 85 scientists led by climate scientists Andrew Dessler and Robert Kopp submitted a 434-page rebuttal to the Federal Register entitled Climate Experts' Review of the DOE Climate Working Group Report, criticizing the DOE report for lacking peer review, cherry-picking evidence, misinterpreting citations, and having a predetermined outcome. The rebuttal was critical of the DOE's selection of authors, saying that they often wrote outside their own expertise, represented a narrow contrarian view not shared by the majority of experts in the field, and that its obvious goal was a means toward a political end.

A Carbon Brief fact-check documented over 100 false or misleading statements in the report, soliciting the opinions of a "wide range of climate scientists". Responses to individual claims made in the report were mainly written by scientists within their area of expertise, often by the author of the work the report had cited. The Associated Press emailed nearly all of the lead authors of the research cited in the DOE report, and an additional 139 other experts in climate, health and economics for their views. Of the 64 who responded, 53 gave the DOE report negative reviews, 7 gave positive responses and 4 gave no clear position.

=== Selective use of data ===
According to scientists interviewed by the Associated Press, the most common critique of the report is that it used cherry-picked data. The 1930s Dust Bowl was used as an example of an extreme heat event that occurred despite low CO_{2} concentrations relative to the present, while ignoring that global temperatures were overall cooler than modern times.

A paper by climate scientist Zeke Hausfather was used to claim that climate models overestimate warming, whereas the actual conclusion was that models were "remarkably accurate." Another section of the report arguing that climate models have a warm bias pointed to a region in the U.S. Corn Belt that represents less than 1% of the planet's total surface area.

Economist Francois Bareille, author of a French-focused study about climate-related crop losses, said his conclusions didn't apply to the U.S. because of differences in climate and agricultural practices. The report elsewhere claims CO_{2} is a "net benefit" to U.S. agriculture without citing research that projects a net negative effect on crop production due to altered rainfall patterns and more extreme weather including droughts and floods, and reduction of insect pollinators.

The report used five U.S. tidal gauges to show relatively little sea level rise as a response to warming, ignoring the totality of data to the contrary.

=== Veracity of claims ===
The report claimed that the recent decline in ocean pH, or ocean acidification is "within the range of natural variability on millennial time scales", whereas the actual conclusion of the cited paper is that the decline is due to human CO_{2} emissions. The report misused the same study to imply that because corals evolved 245 million years ago when CO_{2} was many times higher than the present, they should be able to adapt to comparably low pH levels. However, the paper's author, Krissansen-Totton, said the rapid change in pH is not comparable to the gradual changes which took place millions of years ago.

Rebuttal co-author Kim Cobb said the report falsely claimed that rising open temperatures were within the range of natural variability, saying that "robust lines of evidence" indicate present conditions are causing "unprecedented" marine heat waves that are destroying coral reefs.

The report claimed that the "urban heat island effect" was biasing the global surface temperature record, whereas IPCC assessments show a "minimal to negligible" contribution to trends. According to ABC News, consensus scientists have explained that temperature records are adjusted to compensate for non-climatic biases such as heat island effects, and that the results of those adjustments compare favorably to trends using only rural weather stations and satellite observations.

Jennifer Marlon, director of data science at the Yale Program on Climate Change Communication criticized the report's presentation of data, saying that the "graphs use classic misinformation and disinformation techniques. It is almost a user's guide on how to lie with figures."

The report claimed that "Arctic sea ice extent has declined by about 5% since 1980," but linked to a website for Antarctic sea ice data. While the 5% decline is an accurate figure for Antarctica, Arctic sea ice extent has actually declined by 40% over the same time period.

== Lawsuit alleging violation of Federal Advisory Committee Act ==
Environmental Defense Fund, Inc. v. Wright
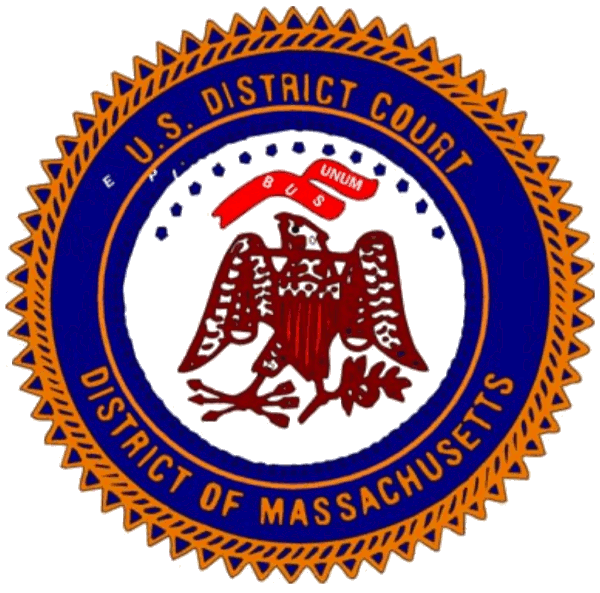
- Court: District of Massachusetts
- Started: August 12, 2025
- Docket nos.: 1:25-cv-12249

Court membership
- Judge sitting: William G. Young

On August 12, 2025, a lawsuit was filed by the Union of Concerned Scientists (UCS) and the Environmental Defense Fund against the DOE and EPA as a whole, and individual defendants Wright, Zeldin and the members of the Climate Working Group. The suit alleges that the manner in which the report was compiled behind closed doors was in violation of the 1972 Federal Advisory Committee Act which requires federal advisory committees to maintain balanced memberships and operate in a public and transparent fashion. A written statement by the UCS described the report as "anti-science", and a "flawed product put forward as an official U.S. government document."

The DOE decided to disband the group rather than face the lawsuit, but Curry said they would continue outside the government and planned to answer comments made on the report. On September 4, the administration unsuccessfully motioned to dismiss after claiming the case was moot because the group had disbanded. The plaintiffs asked the judge for a "preliminary injunction and a stay, or, in the alternative, for summary judgment" against the DOE.

On 30 January 2026, a federal judge ruled that the DOE (but not the EPA) violated the law, as it had "failed to hold open meetings or assemble a balance of viewpoints, as the law requires".
