= Executive Order 14154 =

2025 executive order by Donald Trump

- Long title: Unleashing American Energy

Legislative history
- Signed into law by President Donald Trump on January 20, 2025

Executive Order 14154 entitled "Unleashing American Energy" is an executive order signed by President Donald Trump on January 20, 2025, the day of his second inauguraiton as president.

The order was published in the Federal Register on January 29.

== Background ==
This was the 23rd of 46 Presidential Actions of January 20th 2026, and the 8th EO, of the second term of President Trump.

== Provisions ==
EO14154 revokes 12 Biden administration EOs on the subject of the environment and climate. Sec. 5. of the order revokes EO11991 dated to May 24 1977, at that time administered by President Jimmy Carter in furtherance of the purpose and policy of the National Environmental Policy Act of 1969, as amended (42 U.S.C. 4321 et seq.), the Environmental Quality Improvement Act of 1970 (42 U.S.C. 4371 et seq.), and Section 309 of the Clean Air Act, as amended (42 U.S.C. 1857h-7).

== Overview ==
The goal or hope of the order is for prosperity, and economic and military security, for peaceful ends, against burdensome and ideologically motivated regulations which have impeded the unfettered use of American energy and natural resources. The order establishes a policy to promote energy exploration and production on federal lands and waters and directs federal agencies to review and revise actions that may restrict the development of domestic energy resources.

The order formed part of a broader set of executive actions aimed at expanding domestic oil and gas production, accelerating permitting processes, and revising environmental and energy policies. The EO includes an agenda to "speed up" the use of mineral and rare earth, traditional energy projects "dismantling" previous legislation constraining use of gas and related projects. In addition 14154 revokes the American Climate Corps and Green New Deal. 14154 suggests that agencies would consider annuling the previous use of calculations of the social cost of carbon.

== See also ==
- A Critical Review of Impacts of Greenhouse Gas Emissions on the U.S. Climate
- Executive Order 14148 § Climate change and the environment

== External link ==
- Jeffrey Bossert Clark. "M-25-27" (PDF). Executive Office Of The President Office Of Management And Budget Washington, D.C. 20503. whitehouse.gov.
- "Social Cost of Greenhouse Gases: Background and Recent Developments February 20, 2025 (IF12916)". congress.gov.
