= Chromatographia =

- Discipline: Chemistry
- Language: English
- Edited by: Gabriella Massolini, Brett Paull, Gerhard K. E. Scriba, Roger M. Smith, André M. Striegel

Publication details
- History: 1968-present
- Publisher: Springer Verlag (Germany)
- Frequency: Monthly
- Open access: Hybrid
- Impact factor: 2.044 (2020)

Standard abbreviations
- ISO 4: Chromatographia

Indexing
- ISSN: 0009-5893

Links
- Journal homepage

Chromatographia is a peer-reviewed scientific journal published by Springer Verlag, covering liquid and gas chromatography, as well as electrophoresis and TLC.

== Impact factor ==
Chromatographia had a 2020 impact factor of 2.044.
