= Andrew Dessler =

Climate scientist (born 1964)

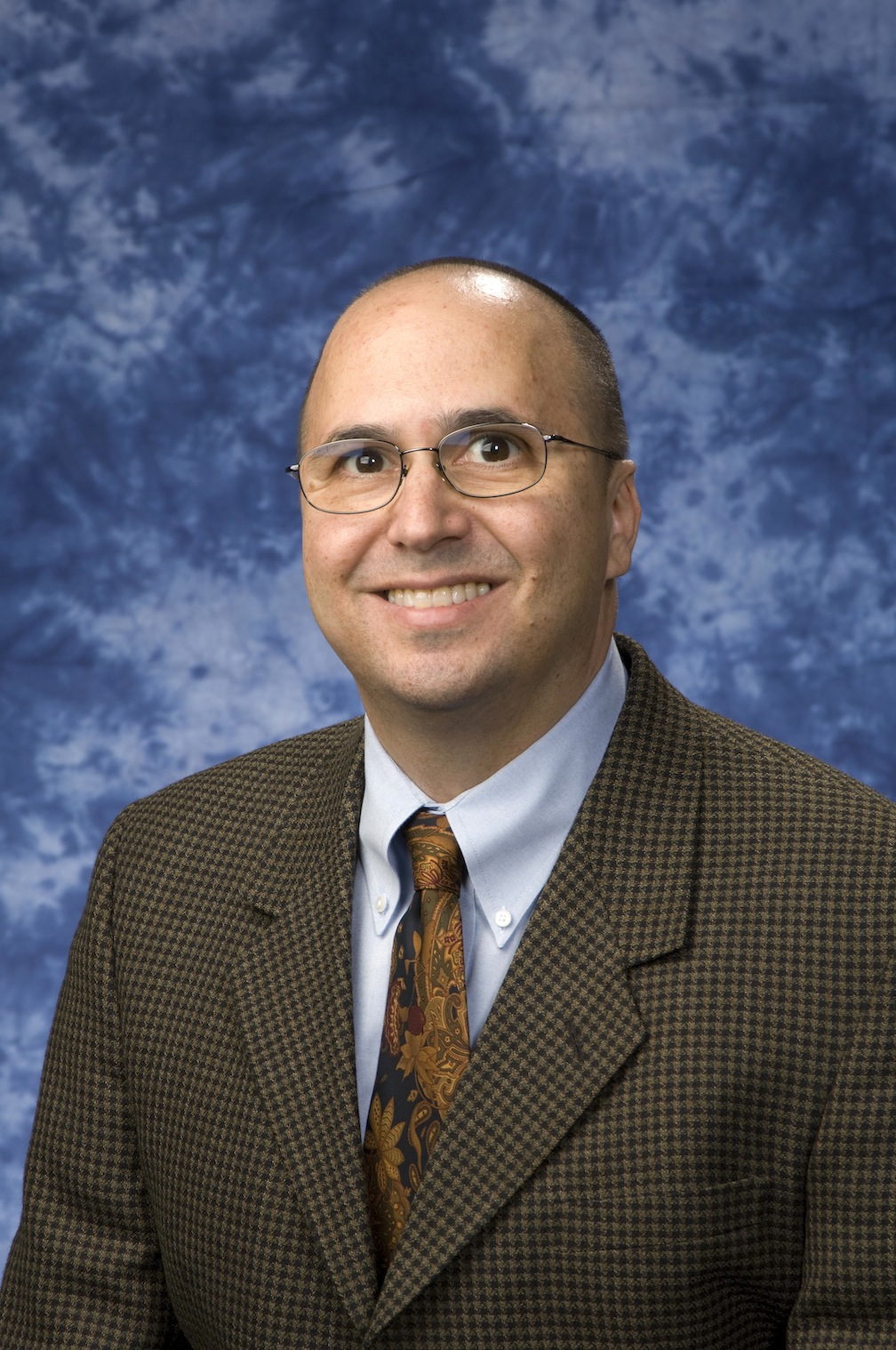
- Born: 1964 (age 61–62); Houston, Texas, U.S.
- Education: Rice University, Harvard University
- Scientific career
- Fields: Atmospheric Science, climatology
- Workplaces: University of Maryland, Texas A&M University
- Thesis: In situ stratospheric ozone measurements (1994)
- Doctoral advisor: James G. Anderson
- Andrew Dessler's voice recorded in February 2014
- Website: andrewdessler.com

Andrew Emory Dessler (born 1964) is a climate scientist. He is Professor of Atmospheric Sciences and Director of the Texas Center for Extreme Weather. His research subject areas include climate impacts, global climate physics, atmospheric chemistry, climate change and climate change policy.

== Early life and education ==
Dessler was born in 1964, in Houston, Texas. His father was Alexander J. Dessler, a planetary physicist then at Rice University. He received a B.A. in physics from Rice University in 1986 and an M.A. and Ph.D. in chemistry from Harvard University in 1990 and 1994. His doctoral thesis was titled In situ stratospheric ozone measurements.

== Career ==
After receiving a Ph.D. in 1994, Dessler did two years of Postdoctoral research at NASA's Goddard Space Flight Center and then spent nine years on the research faculty of the University of Maryland from 1996 to 2005. Dessler went on to become an Associate Professor of Atmospheric Sciences at Texas A&M University from 2005 to 2007 and has been a tenured Professor of Atmospheric Sciences there since 2007. Since 2022, he has been the Director of the Texas Center Extreme Weather, formerly the Texas Center for Climate Studies.

=== Climate research ===
In 2004, The New York Times said the results of his 2004 article in the Journal of Climate written with Ken Minschwaner placed them, "in the middle between the skeptics and those who argue that warming caused by burning of fossil fuels could be extremely severe." The authors subsequently wrote a joint letter to the editor in response objecting to the impression given by the article that their "research goes against the consensus scientific view that global warming is a serious concern."

Later research, published in a 2009 article in Science showed "warming from rising carbon dioxide should also lead to increased water vapor and additional warming, doubling the warming effect of the carbon dioxide." according to Kenneth Chang of The New York Times.

In 2011, an article in The New York Times examining the theory that clouds might offset the effects of increased greenhouse gasses found that his analysis in a 2011 article in Geophysical Research Letters "offered some evidence that clouds will exacerbate the long-term planetary warming" Following the publication of the article "Dessler became a target of climate science critics" and was interviewed on the PBS show Frontline for the episode "Climate of Doubt" which explored "the massive shift in public opinion on climate change." As a visiting fellow at the Cooperative Institute for Research in Environmental Sciences in 2013 and 2014 he is undertaking a project titled, "Understanding long-term variations in stratospheric water vapor." In a November 2013 article in the Proceedings of the National Academy of Sciences of the United States of America Dessler and colleagues provide observational evidence of a positive feedback effect of stratospheric water vapor and global warming.

=== Public Policy ===
Dessler was a policy analyst in the White House Office of Science and Technology Policy for the final year of the Clinton administration. On January 16, 2014 he testified before the US Senate Committee on Environment and Public Works. Dessler has written op-eds on climate change, and has been consulted by newspapers and has given talks on climate change and government policy.

==== DOE Climate Working Group response ====
On July 29, 2025, the United States Department of Energy (DOE) released a report entitled A Critical Review of Impacts of Greenhouse Gas Emissions on the U.S. Climate prepared by its newly-formed Climate Working Group, which consisted of five scientists hand-picked by the Trump administration for their longstanding and vocal contrarian views of climate change. On the same day it was released, the report was cited in the Environmental Protection Agency's (EPA) announcement that was seeking to rescind its 2009 Endangerment Finding, which had concluded that greenhouse gas emissions pose a threat to public health, and which underpins the U.S. government's legal authority to combat climate change.

In response, Dessler and fellow climate scientist Robert Kopp led a group of more than 85 scientists to write a 434-page rebuttal of the DOE document, which was submitted to the DOE, the EPA, and the National Academies. The rebuttal argued that the DOE report's principal conclusions—including claims that there are no significant trends in extreme weather and that carbon dioxide provides broad societal benefits—were misleading or incorrect. According to the rebuttal, the DOE report reached these conclusions through selective use of evidence, emphasis on uncertainties, misrepresentation of peer-reviewed research, and dismissal of decades of established scientific findings.

== Books ==
Dessler and Edward Parson co-authored, The Science and Politics of Global Climate Change: A Guide to the Debate in 2006 (2nd ed. 2009). It was described It was described as, "a fascinating hybrid of science and policy directed at a broad or nonspecialist audience" by Wendy Gordon in a 2008 review in Eos. Gordon's review was positive concluding, "I could comfortably recommend this book to friend and colleagues." and that it would be "an excellent resource for a high school of college-level survey course in either environmental studies or public policy." It also received a favorable review in the Bulletin of the American Meteorological Society by Paul Higgins. Higgins noted the book's, "careful reasoning and thoughtful presentation" and stated it was a sound guide to the climate change debate. Concluding a generally positive review Randall Wigle writing in Canadian Public Policy stated, "...I believe it is a good candidate for a primer for multidisciplinary classes devoted to climate change policy, but it would have been an even better one with less advocacy of one side of the argument." Maria Ivanova wrote in Global Environmental Politics that the book's scholarly value was indisputable. Writing in New Scientist in 2006 Adrian Barnett said, "Free copies should be shipped to anyone who doubts the reality of climate change, starting with presidents in denial." The book also received very positive reviews in Chromatographia, the Times Higher Education Supplement (THES) and Environmental Sciences.

In 2012 Dessler wrote Introduction to Modern Climate Change "a textbook for non-science majors that uniquely immerses the reader in the science, impacts, economics, policies and political debate associated with climate change." It received an award from the American Meteorological Society in 2014. It was favorably reviewed by Cameron Reed in Physics & Society who said, "The writing is clear, has a nice balance of formal and informal prose, and includes occasional elements of dry humor to lighten discussions of otherwise very serious issues." It is used in classes in environmental sciences and the science and policy of climate change.

== Awards and honors ==
- 1999 - NASA Goddard Laboratory for Atmospheres Best Senior Author Publication Award
- 2011 - Google Science Communication Fellow
- 2011 - Texas A&M University Sigma Xi Outstanding Science Communicator Award
- 2012 - Atmospheric Sciences Section Ascent Award, American Geophysical Union
- 2014 - Louis J. Battan Author's Award, American Meteorological Society
- 2017 - Fellow of the American Association for the Advancement of Science
- 2019 - Fellow of the American Geophysical Union
- 2021 - American Geophysical Union Climate Communication Award
- 2022 - "Friend of the Planet" award from the National Center for Science Education (NCSE)

== Publications ==
=== Books authored ===
- The Chemistry and Physics of Stratospheric Ozone. San Diego: Academic Press. 2000. ISBN 9780122120510.
- Introduction to Modern Climate Change (3rd ed.). New York: Cambridge University Press. 2021. ISBN 9781108793872.

=== Books co-authored ===
—; Parson, Edward A. (2019). The Science and Politics of Global Climate Change: A Guide to the Debate (3rd ed.). New York: Cambridge University Press. ISBN 9781316631324.

=== Selected articles ===
- —; Hintsa, E.J.; Weinstock, E.M.; Anderson, J.G.; et al. (November 20, 1995). "Mechanisms controlling water vapor in the lower stratosphere: "A tale of two stratospheres"". Journal of Geophysical Research: Atmospheres. 100 (D11): 23167–72. Bibcode:1995JGR...10023167D. doi:10.1029/95JD02455.
- — (November 15, 1998). "A reexamination of the "stratospheric fountain" hypothesis". Geophysical Research Letters. 25 (22): 4165–8. Bibcode:1998GeoRL..25.4165D. doi:10.1029/1998GL900120.
- — (February 16, 2002). "The effect of deep, tropical convection on the tropical tropopause layer". Journal of Geophysical Research: Atmospheres. 107 (D3): ACH 6–1–ACH 6–5. Bibcode:2002JGRD..107.4033D. doi:10.1029/2001JD000511.
- —; Yang, P. (April 2003). "The distribution of tropical thin cirrus clouds inferred from Terra MODIS data". Journal of Climate. 16 (8): 1241–7. Bibcode:2003JCli...16.1241D. doi:10.1175/1520-0442(2003)16<1241:TDOTTC>2.0.CO;2.
- Minschwaner, K.; — (March 2004). "Water vapor feedback in the tropical upper troposphere: Model results and observations". Journal of Climate. 17 (6): 1272–82. Bibcode:2004JCli...17.1272M. doi:10.1175/1520-0442(2004)017<1272:WVFITT>2.0.CO;2.
- —; Zhang, Z.; Yang, P. (October 2008). "Water-vapor climate feedback inferred from climate fluctuations, 2003–2008". Geophysical Research Letters. 35 (20): L20704. Bibcode:2008GeoRL..3520704D. doi:10.1029/2008GL035333. S2CID 16219995.
- — (2009). "Energy for air capture". Nature Geoscience. 2 (12): 811. Bibcode:2009NatGe...2..811D. doi:10.1038/ngeo691.
- —; Sherwood, S.C. (February 20, 2009). "A matter of humidity". Science. 323 (5917): 1020–1. doi:10.1126/science.1171264. PMID 19229026. S2CID 10362192.
- — (December 10, 2010). "A determination of the cloud feedback from climate variations over the past decade". Science. 330 (6010): 1523–7. Bibcode:2010Sci...330.1523D. doi:10.1126/science.1192546. PMID 21148386. S2CID 42791798.
