= Asia-Pacific Journal of Atmospheric Sciences =

- Discipline: Atmospheric sciences
- Language: English
- Edited by: Chang-Hoi Ho

Publication details
- Former name(s): Journal of the Korean Meteorological Society
- History: 1965-present
- Publisher: Springer Science+Business Media on behalf of the Korean Meteorological Society
- Frequency: Quarterly
- Impact factor: 2.100 (2020)

Standard abbreviations
- ISO 4: Asia-Pac. J. Atmospheric Sci.

Indexing
- ISSN: 1976-7633 (print); 1976-7951 (web)
- OCLC no.: 782078586

Links
- Journal homepage; Online archive

The Asia-Pacific Journal of Atmospheric Sciences is a quarterly peer-reviewed scientific journal covering the field of atmospheric science. It was established in 1965 as the Journal of the Korean Meteorological Society, obtaining its current title in 2008. It is published by Springer Science+Business Media on behalf of the Korean Meteorological Society and the editor-in-chief is Chang-Hoi Ho (Seoul National University). According to the Journal Citation Reports, the journal has a 2020 impact factor of 2.100.
