= Robert Kopp =

American climate change researcher

Robert Kopp is an American climate change researcher. He is a Guggenheim Fellow, fellow of the American Geophysical Union and of the American Association for the Advancement of Science.
