= James R. Holton =

American meteorologist (1938–2004)

- Born: April 16, 1938; Pullman
- Died: March 3, 2004 (aged 65); Seattle
- Education: Harvard University, Massachusetts Institute of Technology
- Occupation: Meteorologist; university teacher
- Employer: University of Washington (1965–2004)
- Awards: Carl-Gustaf Rossby Research Medal (2001); NAS Award for Scientific Reviewing (For his landmark reviews which have become the primary cornerstones of the current understanding of dynamical meteorology of the earth's stratosphere for both researchers and students., 1998); honorary doctor of Stockholm University; Roger Revelle Medal (2000); Jule G. Charney Award (1982); Clarence Leroy Meisinger Award (1973)

James Reed Holton (1938–2004) was a professor of atmospheric sciences at the University of Washington. He was a specialist on atmospheric dynamics, and the author of the atmospheric science textbook An Introduction to Dynamic Meteorology.

He was at the University of Washington for 38 years, and awarded every major award in the atmospheric sciences. He was also a member of the National Academy of Sciences. The American Geophysical Union has now named an award after him, named the James R. Holton award).

== Bibliography ==
- James R. Holton, An Introduction to Dynamic Meteorology, Amsterdam, Academic Press, coll. « International geophysics series », 2013, 5th. ed. with Gregory J. Hakim (1st. ed. 1972), 532 p. (ISBN 978-0-12-384867-3, OCLC 810085226)
- James R. Holton,The dynamic meteorology of the stratosphere and mesosphere, Boston, Springer, coll. « Meteorological Monographs », 1975, 216 p. (ISBN 978-1-935704-31-7)
- James R. Holton, Judith A. Curry and John A. Pyle (dir.), Encyclopedia of Atmospheric Sciences (6 volumes), Amsterdam, Academic Press, 2780 p. (ISBN 978-0-12-227090-1, OCLC 48752862)
