= Model intercomparison project =

Model intercomparison project may refer to:

- Coupled Model Intercomparison Project, a collaborative framework designed to improve knowledge of climate change
- Fisheries and Marine Ecosystem Model Intercomparison Project, a marine biology project to compare computer models of the impact of climate change on sea life
- Atmospheric Model Intercomparison Project, a standard experimental protocol for global atmospheric general circulation models

== See also ==
- Program for Climate Model Diagnosis and Intercomparison
