= Kevin Trenberth =

New Zealand and American climate scientist

Kevin Trenberth CNZM
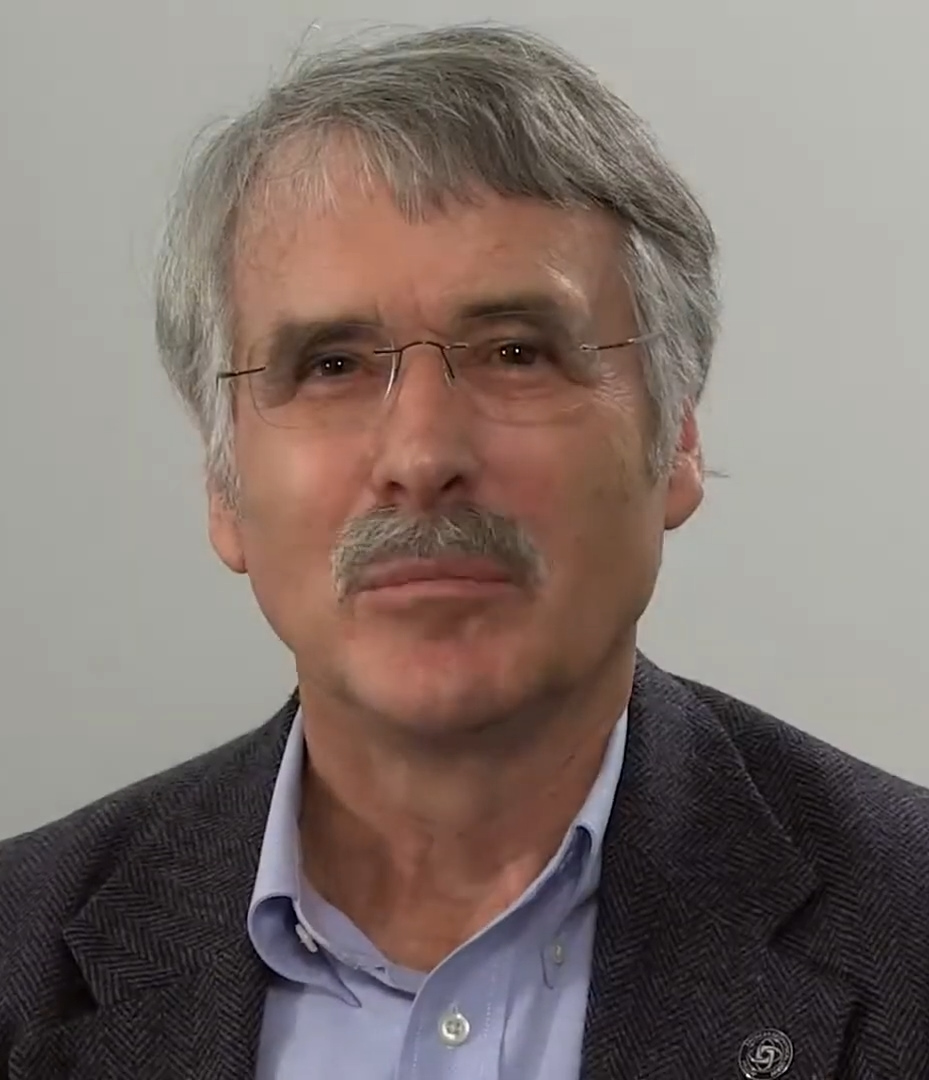
- Trenberth in 2015
- Born: Kevin Edward Trenberth; 8 November 1944 (age 82); Christchurch, New Zealand
- Citizenship: New Zealand and U.S.
- Education: Massachusetts Institute of Technology
- Known for: Climate variability and El Niño–Southern Oscillation; IPCC Lead Author 1995, 2001, 2007 [World Climate Research Programme] Earth's energy budget Ocean heat content Water cycle Climate change attribution Reanalysis; Diagram showing the Earth's energy balance
- Awards: Roger Revelle Medal (2017) Companion of the New Zealand Order of Merit (2024)
- Scientific career
- Fields: Meteorology; atmospheric science; climate science
- Workplaces: New Zealand Meteorological Service; University of Illinois; National Center for Atmospheric Research (NCAR); University of Auckland
- Thesis: Dynamic coupling of the stratosphere with the troposphere and sudden stratospheric warmings. (1972)
- Doctoral advisor: Edward Norton Lorenz

Kevin Edward Trenberth CNZM (born 8 November 1944) is a New Zealand-American climate scientist who worked in the Climate Analysis Section at the US National Center for Atmospheric Research. He was a lead author of the 1995, 2001 and 2007 IPCC assessment reports. He also played major roles in the World Climate Research Programme, for example in its Tropical Oceans Global Atmosphere program (TOGA), the Climate Variability and Predictability (CLIVAR) program, and the Global Energy and Water Exchanges project.

Trenberth has published many publications (634 publications, four videos, and many blogs and podcasts as of November 2023). In addition, his work is also highly cited by other scientists which is shown by his h-index of 136 (136 papers have over 136 citations) in 2023.

Trenberth received the 2017 Roger Revelle Medal from the American Geophysical Union for his work on climate change issues. In the 2024 New Year Honours, Trenberth was appointed a Companion of the New Zealand Order of Merit, for services to geophysics.

Trenberth has New Zealand and U.S. citizenship.

== Early life and education ==
Trenberth was born in Christchurch on 8 November 1944, the eldest son of Ngaira Trenberth (née Eyre) and Edward Maurice Trenberth. He was educated at Linwood High School, where he was dux in 1962, and went on to study at the University of Canterbury, graduating BSc (Hons) with first-class honours in 1966.

After completing his studies at Canterbury, Trenberth worked at the Meteorological Service of New Zealand for two years, and was awarded a research fellowship in 1968 that allowed him to undertake doctoral studies at Massachusetts Institute of Technology. His ScD thesis, supervised by Edward Norton Lorenz and completed in 1972, was titled Dynamic coupling of the stratosphere with the troposphere and sudden stratospheric warmings.

== Career ==
Trenberth returned to the Meteorological Service in Wellington, New Zealand, in 1972 after completing his PhD in the US. He worked there as a research scientist in the New Zealand Meteorological Service (1966–77). In 1977 he moved to the University of Illinois, where he became a full professor. In 1984, he joined the National Center for Atmospheric Research (NCAR). His career at NCAR was in the Climate Analysis Section, where he was the Head for many years.

He became a high level emeritus at NCAR as a Distinguished Scholar in 2019 and he moved back to New Zealand where he is also an honorary affiliated faculty at the University of Auckland.

He has been prominent in most of the IPCC assessment reports and has also extensively served the World Climate Research Programme (WCRP) in numerous ways. He has also served on many U.S. national committees. He served as editor of several journals.

== Research activities ==
Trenberth played a key role in the Tropical Oceans Global Atmosphere program (TOGA) during 1989 to 1994 and he was co-chair of the Scientific Steering Group for the Climate Variability and Predictability (CLIVAR) program from 1996 to 1999. He chaired the WCRP Observation and Assimilation Panel from 2004 to 2010 and chaired the Global Energy and Water Exchanges (GEWEX) scientific steering group from 2010 to 2013 (member 2007 to 2014). In addition, he served on the Joint Scientific Committee of the WCRP and has made significant contributions to research into El Niño-Southern Oscillation.

=== Storms and hurricanes ===
Trenberth began some fundamental work related to changes in extremes with climate change in 1998. Until then, the focus of the scientific community had been mainly on changes in average temperatures and precipitation. Trenberth pointed out that the intermittent nature of precipitation mandated attention to intensity, frequency, duration, and type as well as amount. All storms reach out and gather in the available water vapor, which fuels the storm. Therefore, increases in water vapor in the atmosphere with higher temperatures will lead to greater intensity but less frequency of storms. This is because the total amount of water vapor is controlled by surface evaporation, not temperature. The prospects are therefore for more severe storms.

Until 2004, little attention had been paid to hurricanes and tropical storm changes, but the summer of 2004 was when four hurricanes made landfall in Florida. The question was whether there was a human global warming role in the activity and thus the damage. To Trenberth it was obvious that there was, and he spoke up when official NOAA statements on hurricanes attributed it all to natural climate variability. Trenberth participated in a tele-news conference, set up by Harvard University, and cautiously suggested that global warming was undoubtedly playing some role. This led to a major outcry from some hurricane meteorologists, and extensive criticism for example by Christopher Landsea, an American meteorologist.

As a response, Trenberth published further research on this topic in mid 2005. Coincidentally, a record breaking hurricane season began shortly after (still in 2005) in which Hurricane Katrina caused all kinds of devastation in New Orleans. Two important studies who supported Kevin's research findings came out shortly thereafter: One by Kerry Emanuel, and another led by Peter Webster. Further details on natural variability were provided in a publication by Kevin Trenberth and Dennis J. Shea in 2006. Trenberth further explained the concept to a broader audience in an article on hurricanes and climate change in Scientific American in 2007. It has the short and snappy title: "Warmer Oceans, Stronger Hurricanes".

=== Short-term climate variability ===
In a 2013 scientific paper in Geophysical Research Letters, Trenberth and co-authors presented an observation-based reanalysis of global ocean temperatures. This proposed that a recent hiatus in upper-ocean warming after 2004 had seen the long-term increase interrupted by sharp cooling events due to volcanic eruptions and El Niño. Despite this, ocean warming had continued below the 700 m depth.

In a second 2013 paper, Trenberth and Fasullo discussed the effect of the 1999 change from a positive to negative phase of the Pacific Decadal Oscillation. This was associated with a change of surface winds over the Pacific which had caused ocean heat to penetrate below 700m depth and had contributed to the apparent global warming hiatus in surface temperatures during the previous decade.

In an interview, Trenberth said, "The planet is warming", but "the warmth just isn't being manifested at the surface." He said his research showed that there had been a significant increase in deep ocean absorption of heat, particularly after 1998. He told Nature that "The 1997 to '98 El Niño event was a trigger for the changes in the Pacific, and I think that's very probably the beginning of the hiatus". He said that, eventually, "it will switch back in the other direction." Trenberth's explanation attracted wide attention in the press.

=== Hacked e-mail controversy in 2009 ===
Kevin Trenberth was "one of the victims in 'Climategate' where hacked emails from climate scientists were distorted by climate-change deniers to sow confusion." In the Climatic Research Unit email controversy, an unlawfully disclosed email from Trenberth about one of his publications from 2009 was widely misrepresented; he had written, "The fact is that we can't account for the lack of warming at the moment and it is a travesty that we can't." In that 2009 paper, "An imperative for climate change planning: tracking Earth's global energy", Trenberth had discussed the distribution of heat and how it was affected by climate forcing, including greenhouse gas changes. This could be tracked from 1993 to 2003, but for the period from 2004 to 2008 it was not then possible to explain the relatively cool temperatures of 2008.

Trenberth has stated later: "It is amazing to see this particular quote lambasted so often. It stems from a paper I published this year bemoaning our inability to effectively monitor the energy flows associated with short-term climate variability. It is quite clear from the paper that I was not questioning the link between anthropogenic greenhouse gas emissions and warming, or even suggesting that recent temperatures are unusual in the context of short-term natural variability."

=== Public stance on climate change ===
For decades, Kevin Trenberth has been outspoken about climate change and the urgency to take action. One of his key messages has been: "It's real, the problem is cumulative, and we're causing it. Today's blanket of greenhouse gases would disperse only over centuries. Cutting emissions is the most important of all possible responses." And "we also have to build resilience to the new extremes".

== Honours and awards ==
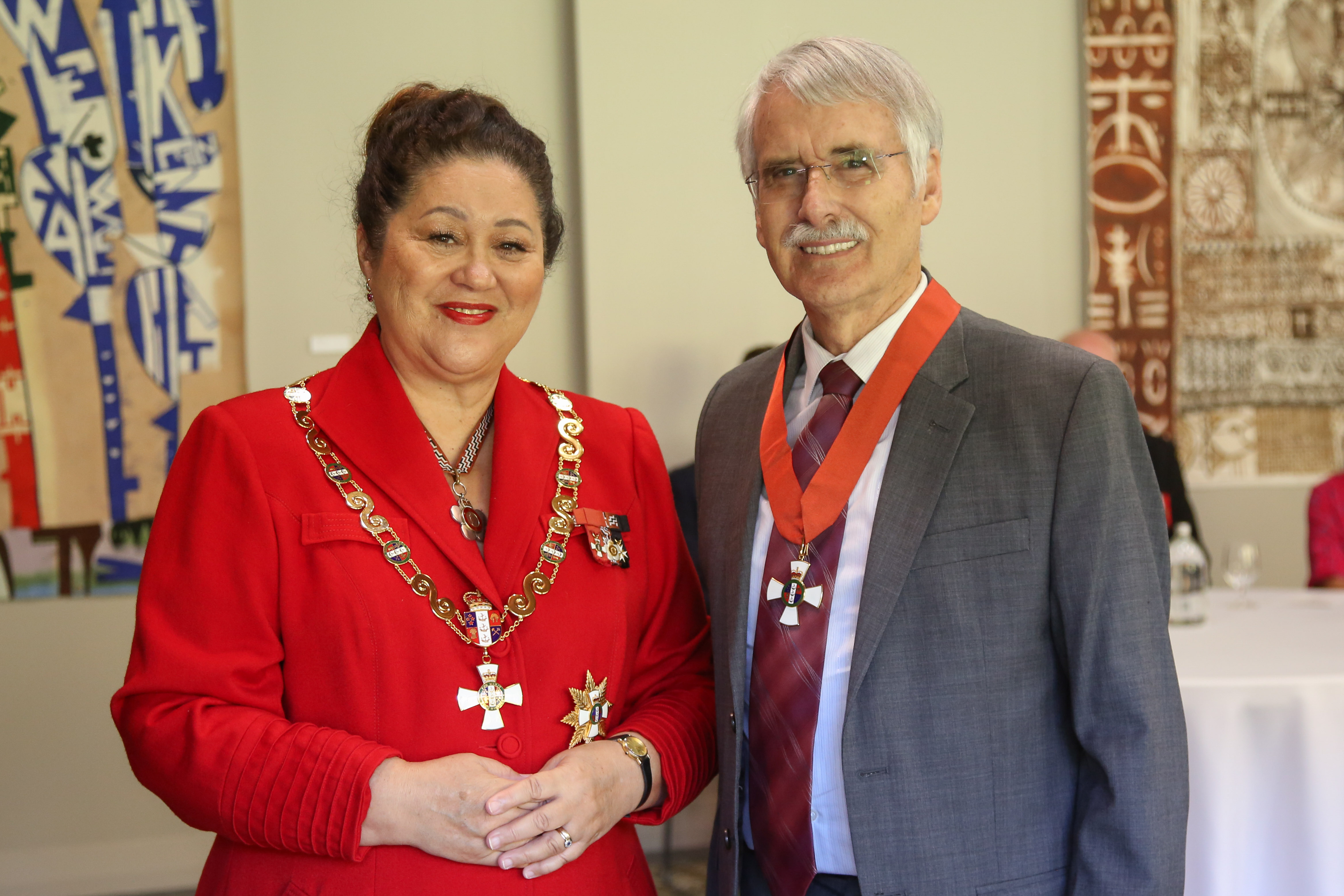
Trenberth (right), after his investiture as a Companion of the New Zealand Order of Merit by the governor-general, Dame Cindy Kiro, at Government House, Auckland, on 8 May 2024

Trenberth was appointed Distinguished Scholar at NCAR in 2020. He is also an honorary faculty member in the Physics Department at the University of Auckland, New Zealand.

Trenberth is a fellow of the American Meteorological Society (AMS), the American Association for Advancement of Science, and the American Geophysical Union; and an honorary fellow of the Royal Society of New Zealand.

In 2000 he received the Jule G. Charney award from the American Meteorological Society; in 2003 he was given the NCAR Distinguished Achievement Award; and in 2013 he was awarded the Prince Sultan Bin Abdulaziz International Prize for Water, and the Climate Communication Prize from American Geophysical Union.

Trenberth received the 2017 Roger Revelle Medal from the American Geophysical Union for his work on climate change issues.

In January 2022 he was celebrated in a one-day Kevin Trenberth Symposium by the American Meteorological Society.

In the 2024 New Year Honours, Trenberth was appointed a Companion of the New Zealand Order of Merit, for services to geophysics.

== Publications ==
According to his staff page at NCAR: "Kevin Trenberth's total number of publications (as of November 2023) is 75 books or book chapters, 298 journal articles, 23 Technical Notes, 117 proceedings or preprints, and 87 other articles, plus four videos, for a total of 634 publications plus 4 videos, and many blogs and podcasts. On the Web of Science, there are 55,523 citations and an H index of 104 (104 publications have 104 or more citations). On Google Scholar, there are more than 132,000 citations and an H index of 136 (or 885 since 2018)."

Furthermore, according to his staff page: "From 1996 until 2017 he ranked first in the number of highly cited papers published out of all 223,246 published environmental scientists."

He has also written numerous articles for the general public, for example in The Conversation and New Zealand's Newsroom.

=== Selected books ===
- 2023: Trenberth, K. E. (2023). A Personal Tale of the Development of Climate Science: The Life and Times of Kevin Trenberth Archived 22 December 2023 at the Wayback Machine, Auckland: Kevin E. Trenberth
- 2022 : The Changing Flow of Energy Through the Climate System Cambridge University Press Archived 22 February 2022 at the Wayback Machine ISBN 978-1108979030
- 2000 : (in collaboration with K. A. Miller, L. O. Mearns and S. Rhodes) "Effects of Changing Climate on Weather and Human Activities" Archived 17 August 2022 at the Wayback Machine University Science Books / University Corporation for Atmospheric Research (UCAR) ISBN 978-1891389146
- 1993 : (editor) Climate System Modeling Cambridge University Press Archived 22 February 2022 at the Wayback Machine ISBN 978-0521128377

== See also ==
- Earth's energy budget
- Loop Current
