= C4MIP =

C^{4}MIP (more fully, Coupled Climate Carbon Cycle Model Intercomparison Project) is a joint project between the International Geosphere-Biosphere Programme (IGBP) and the World Climate Research Programme (WCRP). It is a model intercomparison project along the lines of the Atmospheric Model Intercomparison Project, but for global climate models that include an interactive carbon cycle .
