= Paleoclimate Modelling Intercomparison Project =

The Paleoclimate Modeling Intercomparison Project is a project, somewhat along the lines of AMIP or CMIP, to coordinate and encourage the systematic study of atmospheric general circulation models (AGCMs) and to assess their ability to simulate large climate changes such as those that occurred in the distant past. Project goals include identifying common responses of AGCMs to imposed paleoclimate "boundary conditions," understanding the differences in model responses, comparing model results with paleoclimate data, and providing AGCM results for use in helping in the analysis and interpretation of paleoclimate data. PMIP is initially focussing on the mid-Holocene (6,000 years before present) and the Last Glacial Maximum (21,000 yr BP) because climatic conditions were remarkably different at those times, and because relatively large amounts of paleoclimate data exist for these periods. The major "forcing" factors are also relatively well known at these times. Some of the paleoclimate features simulated by models in previous studies seem consistent with paleoclimatic data, but others do not. One of the goals of PMIP is to determine which results are model-dependent. The PMIP experiments are limited to studying the equilibrium response of the atmosphere (and such surface characteristics as snow cover) to changes in boundary conditions (e.g., insolation, ice-sheet distribution, CO_{2} concentration, etc.)
