= GO-ESSP =

The Global Organization of Earth System Science Portals or (GO-ESSP) is an international collaboration, formed in 2003, that is developing software infrastructure to support the distribution, and analysis of climate model data and related observations.

GO-ESSP is playing a central role in coordinating United States and European efforts to document and distribute data for the 5th coupled model intercomparison project, which will be part of the IPCC Fifth Assessment Report.
