= AMIP =

AMIP may refer to:

- The Atmospheric Model Intercomparison Project, a climate experiment
- The Area Major Incident Pool, a now-obsolete branch of the British police's Criminal Investigation Department, superseded by the Specialist Crime & Operations
