= Geospatial foundation model =

Type of artificial intelligence model trained on Earth observation and geoscientific data

A geospatial foundation model (GFM), also referred to as an Earth observation foundation model, represents a paradigm shift in Earth system modeling by utilizing data-centric artificial intelligence (DCAI) to train on petabytes of structured and unstructured geoscientific data. Unlike conventional, task-specific deep learning systems, GFMs use massive cross-disciplinary datasets to model the Earth's interactive and complex dynamics, offering highly flexible task specifications, multimodal inputs/outputs, and advanced geoscientific knowledge representation.

== Background and history ==
The emergence of data-driven Earth system sciences is underpinned by the massive expansion of big data in geosciences, which currently generates dozens of petabytes of information with hundreds of terabytes transmitted on a daily basis. Traditional machine learning and deep learning methodologies have been successfully applied across varied domains, including geological event monitoring (such as volcanic eruptions and earthquakes) resource mapping and natural resource exploration, weather forecasting, climate modeling and remote sensing analysis for urban planning or land cover classification.

Despite these early successes, traditional artificial intelligence approaches face prominent challenges:

- Data Dependency: Traditional models heavily rely on extensive, high-quality annotated datasets, which are often limited or incomplete due to the variable nature of Earth systems.
- Limited Generalization: The capacity of static AI models to generalize often degrades significantly when encountering novel or distinct geological environments outside their training context.
- Lack of Interpretability: Opaque model outputs challenge the transparency required for geoscientists to firmly establish trust in AI insights.

To address these limitations, foundation models (FMs) have transitioned into the geosciences from computer vision and natural language processing. FMs offer emergent properties such as zero-shot adaptability and contextual reasoning derived from massive neural network scale and self-supervised learning on vast datasets. Early efforts to pioneer GFMs have spanned multiple specializations though broad adoption remains constrained by multi source data complexity and the inherent constraints of contemporary AI architectures.

== Architecture and core mechanisms ==
GFM architectures primarily leverage the modeling capacity of the Transformer architecture, using self-attention mechanisms to process long-range dependencies and contextual relationships, mitigating the historical constraints of recurrent neural networks (RNNs) and convolutional neural networks (CNNs).

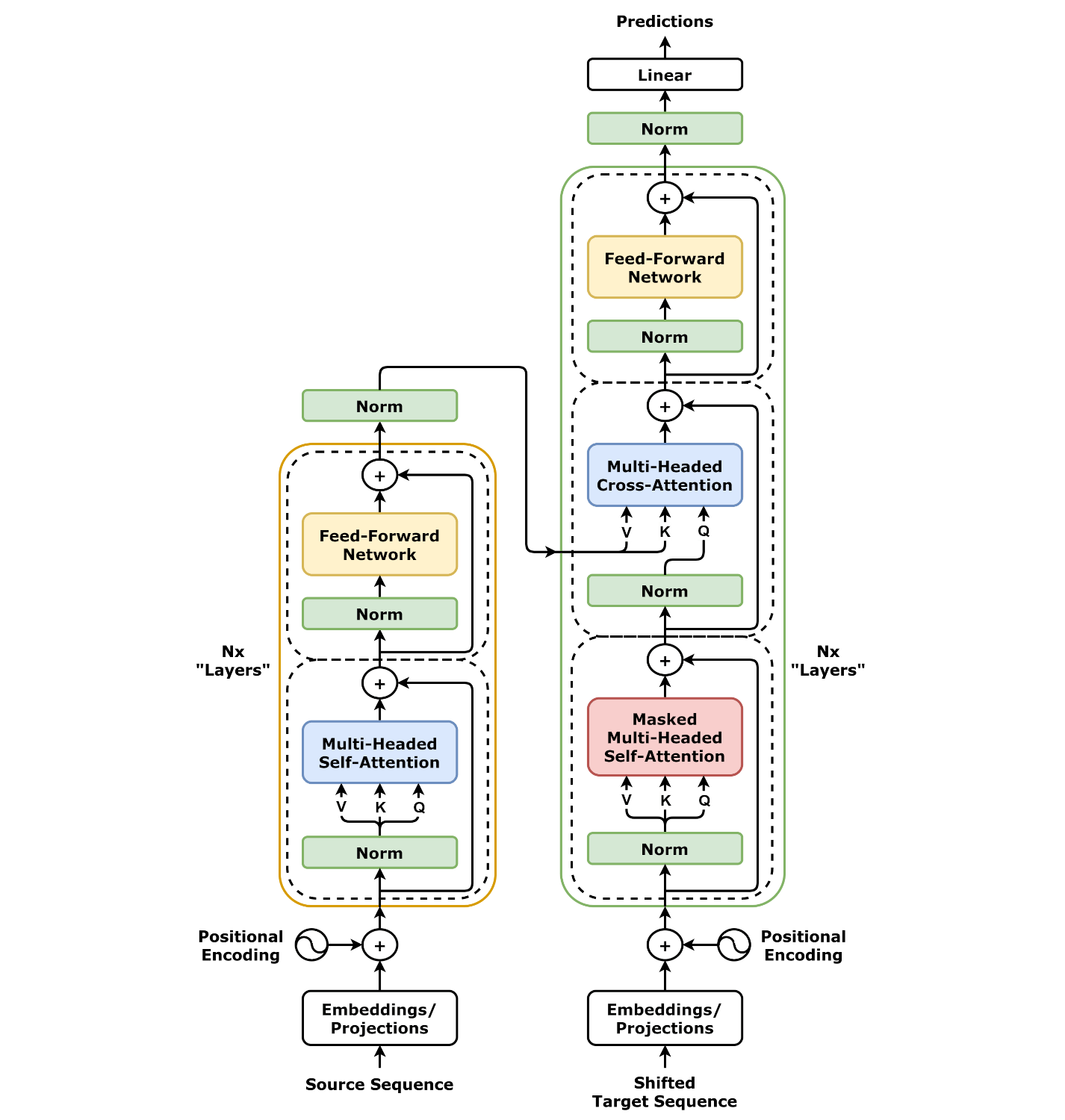
Transformer full architecture

=== Core transformer frameworks ===
- Vanilla Transformers: Composed of encoder and decoder blocks featuring multihead self-attention (MHSA) and position-wise feed-forward layers, to capture contextual sequence vectors uniformly across text length.
- Vision Transformers (ViTs): Adapt the architecture to computer vision tasks by dividing input visual data into localized 16 by 16 patches, flattening them with linear projections, and combining them with positional encodings through an encoder framework. Notable standard variations include TNT, and PVT.
- Vision-Language Transformers: Fuse multimodal visual and textual streams via unified attention mechanisms to capture cross-modal associations for visual question answering (VQA) and image captioning, historically building on models like VisualBERT, Uniter, and OSCAR which combine BERT text processing with Faster-RCNN object detection pipelines.

=== Pretraining taxonomy ===
GFMs acquire general-purpose weights and broad structural representations through expansive training methods:

- Supervised Pretraining: Utilizes large-scale labeled datasets to establish model pillars, historically scaled up through CNN backbones like AlexNet, VGG, and ResNet over ImageNet or equivalent repositories and through Transformer platforms like BERT, RoBERTa, and ALBERT.
- Self-Supervised Pretraining (SSL): Acts as the cornerstone for modern large-scale systems by using pretext tasks to derive implicit pseudo-labels from unlabeled inputs, minimizing human annotation demands. SSL paradigms include:
  - Generative Pretraining: Captures underlying statistical parameters by reconstructing obscured or generated data fields, utilizing frameworks like Variational Autoencoders (VAEs), Context Encoders for inpainting, Masked Autoencoders (MAEs), and Generative Adversarial Networks (GANs) such as BigGAN and SRGAN.
  - Contrastive Pretraining: Optimizes feature representations by bringing matching or augmented data pairs closer in embedding space while repelling dissimilar samples. Core contrastive workflows are anchored by negative sampling (e.g., SimCLR, MoCo iterations), data clustering (e.g., DeepCluster, SwAV), teacher-student knowledge distillation (e.g., BYOL, DINO variants), and cross-correlation matrix redundancy reduction (e.g., Barlow Twins).
  - Predictive Pretraining: Relies on concrete pretext calculations such as relative spatial patch alignment, geometric spatial transformations (e.g., RotNet), or spectral color mapping (e.g., Image Colorization tasks).
- Hybrid Pretraining: Integrates complementary strategies—such as cross-modal contrastive training matched with autoregressive decoding or self-supervised generation paired with downstream oversight—exemplified by multimodal models like CLIP and DALL-E.

=== Adaptation strategies ===
Pretrained foundational backbones are tuned for specific target geoscientific tasks or localized tracking using parameter-efficient frameworks:

- Fine-Tuning: Alters the complete weight configuration using task-specific datasets, often employing smaller learning rates to preserve pretrained global representations.
- Prompt Tuning: Adapts models to downstream contexts without altering underlying weights. In visual-spatial settings, these are deployed as vision-driven prompts (e.g., VPT, DePT, PVIT), language-driven text prompts (e.g., CoOp, PLOT), or dual vision-language prompts (e.g., UPT, DPT, TPT).
- Adapter Tuning: Adds compact, trainable parameters to a frozen base network. These can follow a sequential setup within forward architectures (e.g., Res-adapt, DAN, LST, Conv-Adapter), run parallel to traditional sublayers (e.g., ViT-Adapter, PESF-KD, AdaptMLP), or blend architectures dynamically inside multihead attention systems as mix adapters (e.g., PATT, ETT, PALT, VQT).
- Parameter Tuning: Modifies parameter groups via reparameterization paths, isolating localized weight adjustments (e.g., LoRA, DyLoRA), targeting structural bias updates (e.g., Bitfit, AdapterBias), or modulating weight and bias parts uniformly (e.g., SSF).

== Notable models ==
Advancements in geoscientific foundation models map across distinct modality systems, expanding past foundational language architectures like GPT variants, BERT versions and general text reasoning techniques.

=== Large Language Models (LLMs) for geoscience ===
- GeoBERT: Developed by retraining standard BERT models over 20 million internal geological and geoscientific records to perform field-specific query answering and localized textual summarization.
- BERT-E: Built through targeted domain transfer learning from SciBERT to specialize in earth science keyword classification.
- K2: Pioneered as a dedicated geoscience-specific language foundation model utilizing the unique instruction-driven GeoSignal training dataset and the GeoBench verification collection.
- CnGeoPLM & GeoBERTSegmenter: Optimized for non-English records; CnGeoPLM handles geological entity and relationship extraction over a specialized Chinese text corpus (GeoCorpus), while GeoBERTSegmenter resolves complex geological term word tokenization.
- OceanGPT: Formulated as a dedicated language engine for oceanography and marine sciences using the DoInstruct data method and measured via the OceanBench platform.
- GeoGalactica: A massive specialized 30-billion parameter geoscience model trained explicitly on the extensive GeoCorpus text resource.
- Geospatial Copilots and GIS Engines: Implementations like GPT4GEO, GEOGPT, BB-GeoGPT, and GeoLLM utilize text, geometry, and location engines (such as OpenStreetMap) to evaluate geospatial questions, measure socioeconomic livelihoods, and build realistic automation assistants.

=== Large Vision Models (LVMs) for geoscience ===
- RingMo Series: Introduces a scalable remote sensing model framework driven by masked image modeling over 2 million spatial scenes. Variants include plain ViT models adjusting rotated window dimensions, spatiotemporal sequence trackers (RingMo-Sense), and resource-optimized edge networks (RingMo-Lite).
- Segment Anything Model (SAM) Remote Sensing Adaptations: Adaptations and automated tracking pipelines mapping SAM to spatial datasets include RingMo-SAM, large-scale segment annotation generation tools like SAMRS and RSPrompter, boundary-constrained frameworks, and targeted asset identifiers like GeoSAM for mobility networks.
- Prithvi: An open-source spatial transformer backbone engineered jointly by NASA and IBM, pretrained using more than 1 terabyte of multi-spectral Harmonized Landsat Sentinel-2 (HLS) satellite observations.
- Atmospheric Vision Models: Foundational frameworks applied directly to weather systems and climate dynamics include Climax, W-MAE, FourCastNet, GraphCast, Fengwu, and Pangu-Weather.
- SkySense: A multi-modal visual architecture showing state-of-the-art generalization across global earth image understanding benchmarks.

=== Large Vision-Language Models (LVLMs) for geoscience ===
- GeoChat: Introduced as the first grounded remote sensing visual-language model delivering multi-task conversational features over coordinate inputs.
- EarthGPT & SkyeyeGPT: Multi-modal frameworks deployed for open-set visual scene analysis, multi-sensor imagery captioning, and conversational instruction response.
- RemoteCLIP & CLIP-RS: Adapt cross-modal text-image contrastive training paradigms for remote sensing, using unmanned aerial vehicle views and massive image-caption datasets.
- Lightweight and Multimodal RSVQA Systems: Architectures like LIT-4-RSVQA and prompt-guided visual platforms track multi-spectral queries while evaluating structural dataset biases.

=== Foundational model agents ===
Building on autonomous multi-module agent definitions (comprising perception pipelines, brain modules for storage and decision making, and tool-action vectors), specialized geospatial software agents have emerged:

- RS-ChatGPT: Implements a prompt-driven tool orchestration wrapper enabling ChatGPT to map, segment, and count remote sensing data fields by deploying external vision library scripts.
- Change-Agent: Fuses multi-level change tracking models with text logic to detect, count, and explain terrain alterations over temporal satellite spans.
- RS-Agent: Merges expert knowledge libraries with text and image processing systems to resolve open-ended operational queries in spatial engineering tasks.

== Applications ==
GFMs are deployed across diverse observation vectors spanning space, air, terrestrial ground systems, and deep oceans:

=== Remote sensing, environmental monitoring, and land use ===
The application of spatial vision platforms significantly enhances pixel classification over hyper-spectral and multi-spectral arrays, automating geographic land-use and land-cover (LULC) segmentation workflows without labor-intensive feature manual curation. These architectures track long-term deforestation trends, model carbon biomass reserves, isolate vegetation changes, and manage building extraction footprints or structural urban modifications over time.

=== Climate dynamics and weather forecasting ===
GFMs function as unified multi-source processing centers, assimilating disjointed observation data from weather stations, high-resolution radars, and orbiting satellites to generate contextually unified semantic representations. Deployed predictive networks downscale coarse global grid targets, measure regional drought extensions, track severe typhoon pathways, and enhance the tracking velocity of extreme precipitation events.

=== Terrestrial geophysics and seismology ===
In terrestrial ground settings, deep spatial architectures manage high-dimensional waveforms, historical subsurface geological profiles, and live sensor measurements. This assists in modeling intricate crustal deformations, updating geological hazard maps, mapping deep mineral or petrochemical reserves, and evaluating earthquake behaviors, seismic waveforms, or chaotic landslide hazards.

=== Oceanography and marine exploration ===
GFMs support interactive three-dimensional visualization networks mapping sub-surface, biological, and environmental observation streams. Deployed across intermediate and deep midocean zones (from 100 to 1,000 meters deep), these systems leverage intelligent sensor fusion to explore sparse marine coordinates, evaluate temperature fields, simulate fluid dynamics, and optimize marine conservation choices within Deep Blue AI platforms.
