= Vocals (disambiguation) =

Vocals are musical sounds produced with the voice.

Vocals may also refer to:

- SoCal VoCals, an American vocal group
- VOCALS, a meteorology field project
- Vocals (phonetics), sounds made by a human being using the vocal folds
