= Baseline Surface Radiation Network =

Project of World Climate Research Programme

Baseline Surface Radiation Network (BSRN) is a project of the World Climate Research Programme (WCRP) and the Global Energy and Water Cycle Experiment (GEWEX) and as such is aimed detecting important changes in the Earth's radiation field at the Earth's surface which may be related to climate changes. The central archive of the BSRN is the World Radiation Monitoring Center (WRMC) which was initiated by Atsumu Ohmura in 1992 and operated at ETH until 2007. Since 2008 the WRMC is operated by the Alfred Wegener Institute for Polar and Marine Research (AWI), Germany.

== Objectives ==
- To monitor the background (least influenced by immediate human activities which are regionally concentrated) shortwave and longwave radiative components and their changes with the best methods currently available.
- To provide data for the calibration of satellite-based estimates of the surface radiative fluxes.
- To produce high quality observational data to be used for validating the theoretical computations of radiative fluxes by models.

== See also ==
- Global dimming
