= WCRP =

WCRP may refer to:

- WCRP (FM), a radio station (88.1 FM) licensed to serve Guayama, Puerto Rico
- Religions for Peace, also known as the World Conference of Religions for Peace and the World Council for Religions and Peace.
- World Climate Research Programme, a program sponsored by the Intergovernmental Oceanographic Commission of UNESCO.
