= NOBM =

NASA ocean biogeochemical model

NASA Ocean Biogeochemical Model (NOBM) is a three-dimensional representation of coupled circulation/biogeochemical/radiative processes in the global oceans. It was built at the Global Modeling and Assimilation Office and is in the process of being coupled to the Goddard Earth Observing System Model, Version 5 (GEOS-5) climate systems.

It spans the domain from -84° to 72° latitude in increments of 1.25° longitude by 2/3° latitude, including only open ocean areas, where bottom depths are greater than 200 m. The biogeochemical model contains 4 phytoplankton groups, four nutrient groups, a single herbivore group, and three detrital pools.
