= National Unified Operational Prediction Capability =

The National Unified Operational Prediction Capability (NUOPC) is a collaboration of modeling centers. The group is currently developing a new ensemble forecasting system for operational numerical weather prediction.

Partners of NUOPC include the United States Navy, the National Weather Service, and the United States Air Force.

The centers are using common modeling infrastructure in the form of the ESMF software framework to increase the interoperability of software components provided by different sources.
