= Atsumu Ohmura =

Japanese climatologist (born 1942)

Atsumu Ohmura (大村 纂, Ōmura Atsumu, born 1942) is a Japanese climatologist, known for his discovery and contributions to the theory of global dimming.

== Early life and education ==
Ohmura was born in the Bunkyō ward of Tokyo in 1942. In 1965 he graduated with a B.Sc. from the University of Tokyo and in 1969, he received an M.Sc. from McGill University. He later received a Dr.sc.nat from the ETH Zurich.

== Career ==
Ohmura is a professor emeritus of the Institute for Atmospheric and Climate Science at ETH Zurich, where he was the leader of the institute's climate research group. The group has strong interests in the planetary boundary layer and the cryosphere including its interaction with the atmosphere and ocean. The group maintains a general circulation model. Ohmura also initiated the Baseline Surface Radiation Network (BSRN).

== Awards ==
In March 2021 he was awarded the IASC Medal by the International Arctic Science Committee "for outstanding achievements in understanding complex climate and glacier relationships, global energy budgets, and thermal energy flow in the Arctic; and for excellence in program building, international collaborations, and mentorship in the cryospheric sciences."
