= METAFOR =

Climate data project

The Common Metadata for Climate Modelling Digital Repositories, or METAFOR project, is creating a Common Information Model (CIM) for climate data and the models that produce it.

The CIM aims to describe climate data and the models that produce it in a standard way, and to address the fragmentation and gaps in availability of metadata (data describing data) as well as duplication of information collection and problems of identifying, accessing or using climate data that are currently found in existing repositories. A further aim of the METAFOR project is to ensure the wide adoption of the CIM.

METAFOR is optimizing the way climate data infrastructures are used to store knowledge, thereby adding value to primary research data and information, and providing an essential asset for the numerous stakeholders actively engaged in climate change issues (policy, research, impacts, mitigation, private sector).

METAFOR has created tools for practical use of the CIM, e.g., the CMIP5 questionnaire for input and creation of CIM documents. External groups, e.g., the Earth Systems Grid, are also writing tools for CIM content.

== METAFOR and the CMIP5 metadata questionnaire ==
METAFOR was tasked by the World Climate Research Programme to produce the metadata for the 5th Coupled model intercomparison project, an international experiment involving multiple general circulation models that will serve as a basis for the IPCC Fifth Assessment Report.

The CMIP5 questionnaire is an ambitious metadata collection tool and will help scientists to provide the most comprehensive metadata of any climate model inter-comparison project. It aims to collect enough detail to allow users to easily:

- browse the archive & find desired datasets
- easily differentiate between the “genealogy” (related models & experiments) of datasets

The questionnaire also allows users to enter descriptions of components which are not already specified by the questionnaire controlled vocabulary. It produces XML output complies with the Metafor Common Information Model (CIM), allowing tools and services developed using the CIM to be applied to the questionnaire outputs.
