= Fisheries and Marine Ecosystem Model Intercomparison Project =

Marine biology project

The Fisheries and Marine Ecosystem Model Intercomparison Project (FishMIP) is a marine biology project to compare computer models of the impact of climate change on sea life. Founded in 2013 as part of the Inter-Sectoral Impact Model Intercomparison Project (ISIMIP), it was established to answer questions about the future of marine biodiversity, seafood supply, fisheries, and marine ecosystem functioning in the context of various climate change scenarios. It combines diverse marine ecosystem models from both the global and regional scale through a standardized protocol for ensemble modelling in an attempt to correct for any bias in the individual models that make up the ensemble. FishMIP's goal is to use this ensemble modelling to project a more robust picture of the future state of fisheries and marine ecosystems under the impacts of climate change, and ultimately to help inform fishing policy.

== Background ==
=== Ensemble modelling ===
Ensemble modelling is combining the outputs of multiple models that are all working on the same question. This allows researchers to analyze the different vulnerabilities of each individual model, and weigh the impact of particular inputs. Aggregating all the outputs and then using the outputs with the highest frequency across the models minimizes the error in the projection.

== FishMIP ==
Ensemble modelling is generally difficult because of the variety of possible inputs and outputs, which makes it challenging to run different models on the same data and compare results. The FishMIP protocols standardize input variables, as well as the names of files and data stores. The inputs are collected from simplified fishing scenarios, models of the climate and how much greenhouse gas will be in the atmosphere. These standardized inputs and scenarios can then be used to drive multiple ecosystem models, and the outputs are then combined through an ensemble modelling approach. The FishMIP standardizing protocol allow for these diverse inputs to be collated, thus minimizing projection error.

Some of the models used:

=== Global ===
- Apex Predators ECOSystem Model (ApeCOSM)
- BiOeconomic mArine Trophic Size-spectrum (BOATS)

=== Regional ===
- Atlantis
- Ecopath
- OSMOSE

=== Use in studies ===
Although at an earlier stage than the Coupled Model Intercomparison Project, as of 2021 studies suggest that larger fish species and the tropics are most affected by climate change.

- Gómara et al. (2019) used it to predict tropical Pacific fisheries
- du Pontavice et al. (2021) used it to examine the impacts of climate on predators and ecosystems
- Bryndum-Buchholz et al. (2018) examined the impacts of climate change on animal biomass and ecosystem structure
- Bryndum-Buchholz et al. (2020) used the model outputs to investigate the relationship between North Atlantic fisheries and climate change impacts
- Boyce et al. 2020 used the modelling outputs to examine socioeconomic gaps that would result from climate induced biomass losses amongst fisheries
- Lotze et al. 2019 also looked at the impact of climate change via trophic amplification of biomass losses of marine species
