= VAMOS Ocean-Cloud-Atmosphere-Land Study =

International field experiment

The VAMOS Ocean-Cloud-Atmosphere-Land Study (VOCALS) is an international field experiment started in 2006 designed by World Climate Research Programme's core project CLIVAR to better understand physical and chemical processes central to the climate system of the Southeast Pacific region. The program was organized in two parts: the VOCALS Regional Experiment (VOCALS-Rex) , and the VOCALS Numerical Modeling (VOCALS-Mod).

VOCALS-REx occurred in October and November 2008. It makes up a great deal of the CLIVAR program, (VOCALS) was designed to promote scientific enterprises in the Southeastern Pacific, in order to better understand coupled ocean-atmosphere-land system on diurnal to interannual timescales.

VOCALS-REx will also provide datasets for the evaluation and development of large scale numerical models. VOCALS-REx is in five research aircraft, two ships and two surface sites in Northern Chile.

Research papers summarizing the results of the program are published in special issue 184 of Atmospheric Chemistry and Physics, a journal of the European Geosciences Union.
