= Global Energy and Water Exchanges =

International energy project

The Global Energy and Water Exchanges Project (abbreviated GEWEX, formerly named the Global Energy and Water Cycle Experiment from 1990 to 2012) is an international research project and a core project of the World Climate Research Programme (WCRP).

In the water cycle, the amount of solar radiation reaching the Earth affects how much water evaporates from oceans, and how long it is retained on land

In the beginning, the project intended to observe, comprehend and model the Earth's water cycle. The experiment also observes how much energy the Earth receives, and studies how much of that energy reaches the surfaces of the Earth and how that energy is transformed. Sunlight's energy evaporates water to produce clouds and rain and dries out land masses after rain. Rain that falls on land becomes the water budget which can be used by people for agricultural and other processes.

GEWEX is a collaboration of researchers worldwide to find better ways of studying the water cycle and how it transforms energy through the atmosphere. If the Earth's climates were identical from year to year, then people could predict when, where and what crops to plant. However, the instability created by solar variation, weather trends, and chaotic events creates weather that is unpredictable on seasonal scales. Through weather patterns such as droughts and higher rainfall these cycles impact ecosystems and human activities. GEWEX is designed to collect a much greater amount of data, and see if better models of that data can forecast weather and climate change into the future.

== Project structures ==
GEWEX is organized into several structures. As GEWEX was conceived projects were organized by participating factions, this task is now done by the International GEWEX Project Office (IGPO). IGPO oversees major initiatives and coordinates between national projects in an effort to bring about communication between researchers. IGPO claims to support communication exchange between 2000 scientist and is the instrument for publication of major reports.

The Scientific Steering Group organizes the projects and assigns them to panels, which oversee progress and provide critique. The Coordinated Energy and Water Cycle Observations Project (CEOP) the 'Hydrology Project' is a major instrument in GEWEX. This panel includes geographic study areas such as the Climate Prediction Program for the Americas operated by NOAA, but also examines several types of climate zones (e.g. high altitude and semi-arid). Another panel, the GEWEX Radiation Panel oversees the coordinated use of satellites and ground-based observation to better estimate energy and water fluxes. One recent result GEWEX's Radiation panel has assessed data on rainfall for the last 25 years and determined that global rainfall is 2.61 mm/day with a small statistical variation. While the study period is short, after 25 years of measurement regional trends are beginning to appear. The GEWEX Modeling and Prediction Panel takes current models and analyzes the models when climate forcing phenomena occur (global warming as an example of a 'climate forcing' event). GEWEX is now the core project of WCRP.

== Goals and design ==
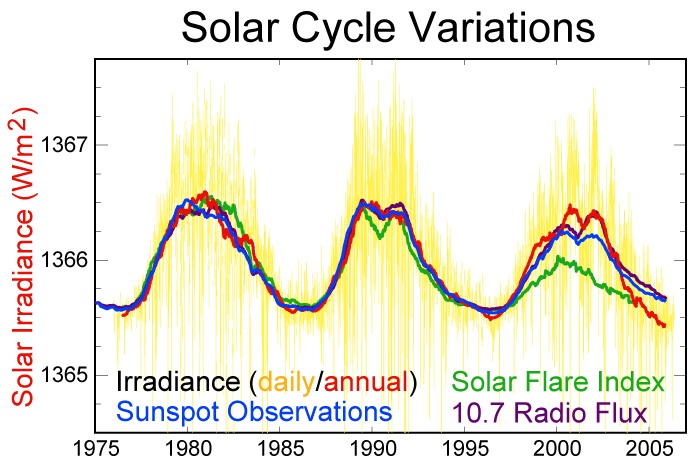
To determine energy budget and flux, scientists need to know the amount of radiation reaching the Earth.

Predicting weather change requires accurate data that is collected over many years, and the application of models. GEWEX was conceived to respond to the need for observations of the Earth's radiation budget and clouds. Many preexisting techniques were limited to observations taken from land and populated areas. This ignored the large amount of weather that occurs over the oceans and unpopulated regions, with key data missing from these areas. Since satellites orbiting the Earth cover large areas in small time frames, they can better estimate climate where measurements are infrequently taken. GEWEX was initiated by World Climate Research Programme (WCRP) to take advantage of environmental satellites such as TRMM, but now uses information from newer satellites as well as collections land-based instruments, such as BSRN. These land-based instruments can be used to verify information interpreted from satellite. GEWEX studies the long-term and regional changes in climate with a goal of predicting important seasonal weather patterns and climate changes that occurs over a few years.

Radiation, humidity, and aerosols
Sunlight and rain
The Earth is made of matter, including water, which absorbs and emits energy into space. Should the Earth not orbit a star, the water would freeze solid and little precipitation would occur because the rate of evaporation would be very low. If the Earth were devoid of water, it would heat to great temperatures in the daytime and cool off more quickly at night. Therefore, water modulates heat energy by transitioning between ice, water, and steam. When heat is applied, ice becomes water and water becomes vapor-steam, absorbing heat energy. When cooling is applied, vapor condenses into water and water freezes into ice, releasing heat. While these are simple examples, rainfall results from a complex set of processes. When sunlight hits the oceans it forces liquid water into the vapor state at a rate dependent on surface temperatures, humidity, winds and pressure. At equilibration, water reaches 100% humidity, and during the day, the temperature rises, allowing more moisture to accumulate in the air. At night the temperature falls and water tends to form clouds, often resulting in ground fog in coastal areas.

At 100% humidity, any loss of radiant energy from water causes vapor to condense into water. Circulation and convection can carry moist air upward in the air column, and this often cools moist air. The air forms water droplets, even in the heat of daytime, creating clouds. As the density of droplets in the clouds increase, the air can no longer support droplets and they fall as rain. More moist air can be drawn into clouds as energy is released, allowing the development of large thunderstorms. Prevailing winds are a factor in storm formation, particularly when changes occur. Tropical waves that develop in westerly flows around the Earth's semitropical and tropical region can organize into horizontal circles over the water, creating a cyclone.

A cyclone showing the flow of moist air as it dissipates energy into the tropopause

A cyclone is a stereotype energy transfer system. It gathers steam off of warm water and quickly moves it upwards releasing the energy into space. This causes the characteristic rain bands. The energy transferred is so great it gives rise to catastrophic winds, which disturb surface waters, increasing steam release, and also increase the rate at which moisture is drawn into the center. The heat of the water under the storm drops. Cyclones demonstrate how much latent energy is stored in the world's oceans.

Fluxes, radiation and aerosols
The moisture for a cyclone can be defined as the warm water below the storm. As the cyclone leaves warm water its energy dissipates quickly. Less powerful, long-term rainfall generators can rely on moisture driven by warm waters far from the greatest region of rainfall. In the tropics, the energy came from, stored heat in ocean currents and moving thermoclines can provide sources far away, such as is seen in El-Nino.

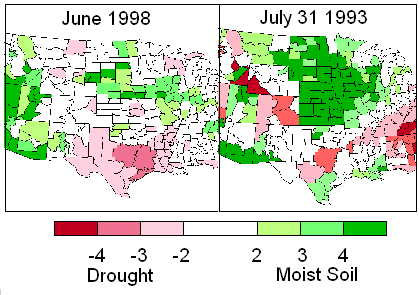
Soil moisture as a factor in the great flood of 1993

Another example is the floods that hit the Midwest U.S. in 1993. The energy that drove moisture into the air occurred in the Gulf, and strong winds and lack of cooling in coastal regions permitted the moisture to travel 1000 miles until conditions were ripe for rain. As the rain fell it cooled the air and dissipated heat, and as new moisture arrived, the process continued. When the sun did come out, it heated wet ground, which created more rain.

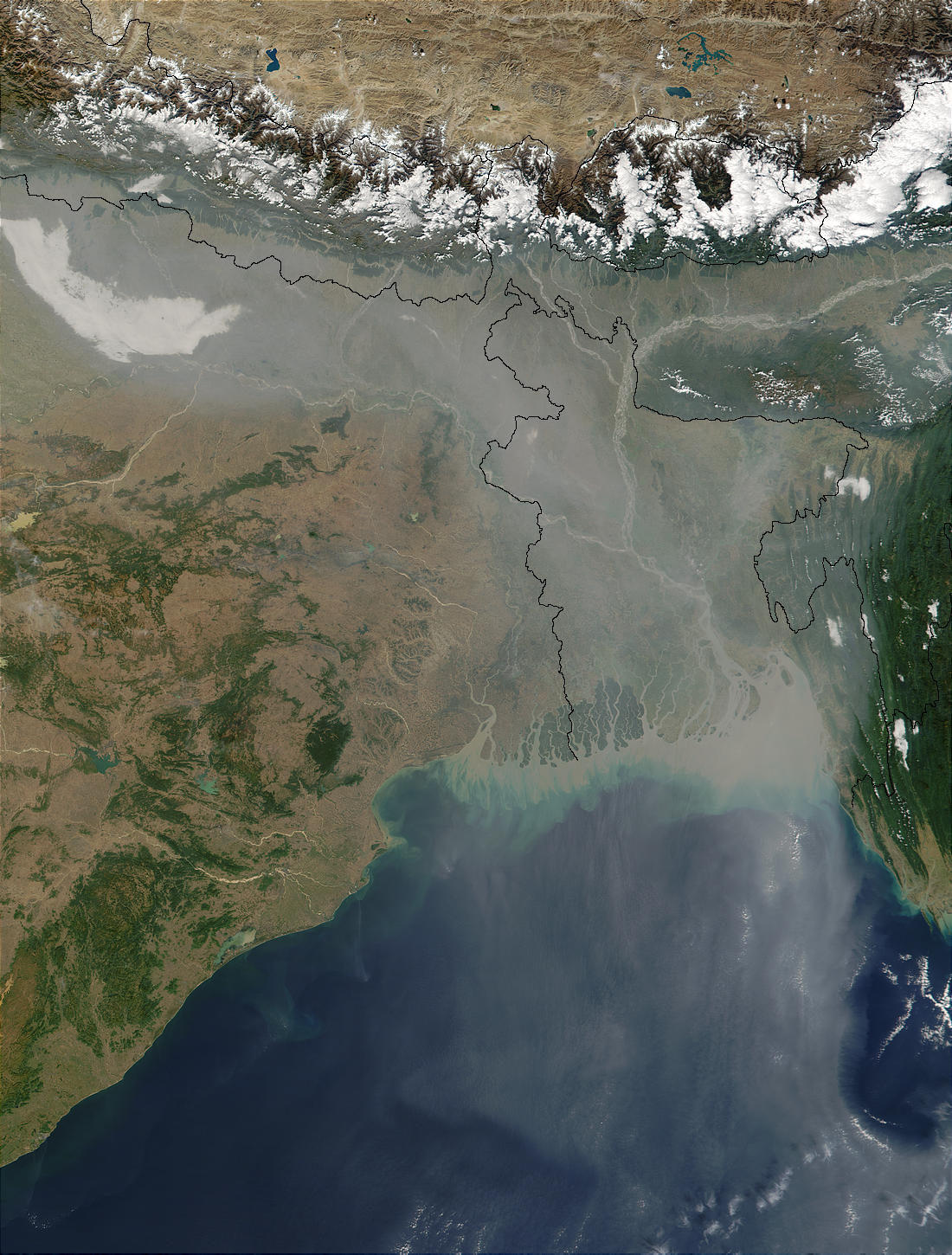
Aerosol pollution over Northern India and Bangladesh

Aerosols over the ocean can cause a lack of sufficient heat in the middle of the day to create sufficiently humid air. When the air reaches land, which may be warmer, there may be inadequate convection and other processes to create rains, and this can cause droughts. To better see these events progress, scientists need data and models to see what elements of the data are most useful in determining rainfall.

=== Research goals ===
The research interest of GEWEX is to study fluxes of radiation at the Earth's surface, predict seasonal hydration levels of soils and develop accurate models of predicting energy and water budgets around the world. The project sets its goal as to improve, by an order of magnitude, the ability to model and therefore prediction hydration (rainfall and evaporation) patterns GEWEX is linked to other WCRP projects such as Stratospheric Processes and their Role in Climate (SPARC) Project, and the Climate and Cryosphere Project through WCRP. and thus shares information and goals with other WCRP projects. The goal becomes more important with the newer WCRP project, the Coordinated Observation and Prediction of the Earth System.

==== Complexity of the experiment ====
Aside from fluctuations of solar radiation, the sunlight that is transformed by the Earth can vary greatly, some have concluded for instance, that ice-ages self-perpetuate once enough ice has accumulated in the polar regions to reflect enough radiation at high elevations to lower the global average temperature, whereas it takes an unusually warm period to reverse this state. Water usage by plants, herbivore activities can change albedo in the temperate and tropical zones. These trends in reflection are subject to change. Some have proposed extrapolating pre-GEWEX information using new information and measurements taken with pre-GEWEX technology. Natural fires, volcanism, and man-made aerosols can alter the amount of radiation reaching the Earth. There are oscillations in oceanic currents, such as El-Niño and North Atlantic Oscillation, which alter the parts of the Earth's ice mass and land water availability. The experiment takes a sampling of climate, with some trends lasting a million years, and as paleo-climatology shows, can abruptly change. Therefore, the ability to use data to predict change depends on factors that are measurable over periods of time, and factors that can affect global climate that abruptly appear can markedly alter the future.

=== Design ===
GEWEX is being implemented in phases. The first phase comprises information gathering, modelling, predictions, and advancement of observation techniques and is complete. The second phase addresses several scientific questions such as prediction capacity, changes in Earth's water cycle, and the impact on water resources.

==== First phase (1990–2002) ====
Phase I (1990–2002), also called the "Build-Up Phase", was designed to determine the hydrological cycle and energy fluxes by means of global measurements of atmospheric and surface properties. GEWEX was also designed to model the global hydrological cycle and its impact on the atmosphere, oceans and land surfaces. Phase I processes were to develop the ability to predict the variations of global and regional hydrological processes & water resources, and their response to environmental change. It was also to advance the development of observing techniques, data management, and assimilation systems for operational application to long-range weather forecasts, hydrology, and climate predictions.

During Phase I GEWEX projects were divided into the three overlapping sectors.

1. GEWEX Radiation Panel (GRP) used satellite and ground-based sensing over long periods to determine to delineate natural variation and climate changing forces.
2. GEWEX Modelling and Prediction Panel (GMPP): Model the energy and water budget of the earth and determine the predictability. Apply modeling to determine climate forcing events, or respond to climate forcing events by analysis of predictions.
3. GEWEX Hydrometeorology Panel (GHP) - Modeled and predicted changes in water cycle events on longer time scales (up to annual) using intensive regional studies to determine efficacy of data gathering and predictions. The Continental-Scale Experiments (CSEs) relied heavily on the following study areas that would eventually form the basis of the Coordinated Enhanced Observing Period (CEOP):

- Canada - Mackenzie river basin study area (MAGS) -completed
- United States - North American study area or GEWEX American Prediction Project(GAPP).
- Brazil - Large-Scale Biosphere Atmosphere Experiment in Amazonia (LBA)
- Scandinavia - Baltic Sea Experiment (BALTEX)
- Southern Africa - African Monsoon Multidisciplinary Analysis Project (AMMA)
- Indopacific and Asia - GEWEX Asian Monsoon Experiment (GAME) - completed in 2005
- Australia - Murray-Darling Basin Water Budget Project (MDB)
But also:
- Continental-scale - International Project (GCIP)
- International Satellite Land-Surface Climatology Project (ISLSCP)

CEOP projects interacted with other non-GEWEX projects like CLIVAR and CLiC

===== Results =====
The results of the build-up phase include 15 to 25 years of study, measured the indirect effects of aerosols, compiled a correlated data set, some reductions in uncertainty GEWEX claims the following accomplishments: A long period data set of clouds, rain fall, water vapor, surface radiation, and aerosols with no indication of large global trends, but with evidence of regional variability, models showing increased precipitation, and showed the importance of regional factors, such as water and soil conservation in regional climate change. The Phase I also claims to have produced over 200 publications and 15 review articles.

The Mississippi watershed was part of the GEWEX Continental scale International Projects and as a result was well situated for the analysis of the Great Flood of 1993 (Mississippi River and Red River watersheds). The coordination between ground sensing observations and satellite information allowed a more thorough analysis of events that led up to the flood. Researchers at the Center for Ocean-Land-Atmosphere Studies (COLA) found that upstream soil moisture and a multifold increase of moist air flow from the Gulf of Mexico to the flooded regions was a major factor in excessive rainfall. The Global Land/Atmosphere System Study (GLASS) gave GEWEX investigators the ability to observe soil wetness over much of the world's surface by correlating observations on the ground with information obtained by satellites. While the ability to show cause is important, the different conditions (soil wetness, global patterns) that were permissive for weather anomalies are the focus of Phase I, gathering information and learning how to use satellite information better.

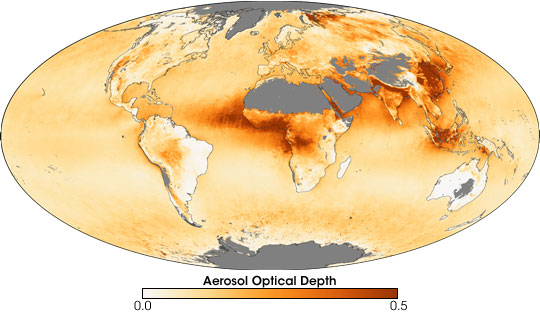
Aerosol map from 2006 showing increased aerosols, likely fires, in developing countries

One of the biggest impacts of the Aerosol analysis has been the demonstration of the fairly large impact of anthropogenic aerosols, smoke patterns, even daily ripples of aerosols can be observed off the coasts of some developing nations and extend hundreds of miles over surrounding oceans. Some have questioned whether this aerosol pollution is partly to blame for long-term drought in places like the African Sahel.

===== Critique =====
One critique of the Build-up Phase data and predictions is that there needs to be better error descriptions. The global estimate of rainfall indicates that the confidence range is large relative to possible trends. The number of ground sensing stations (currently around 40) in the BSRN is rather limited for global observation this affected the measurement of aerosols which are regionally dominant. The best measurements of aerosol pollution are obtained when cloud types are identified properly by satellite observation, therefore better cloud sensing strategies and models are needed to provide the clearest real-time data. Certain projects like GCIP allow have focused on continental scale observations provide better prediction for project areas; however, areas outside these project areas may lag in receiving forecasting improvements. Many of the deficiencies in Phase I are improvement areas within the objectives of Phase II of the project. Currently scientist use NASA Aqua's Advanced Microwave Scanning Radiometer (AMSR-E) to evaluation soil moisture from space. However, except for focused observations the satellites data is not useful for global weather prediction. The proposed Soil Moisture and Ocean Salinity satellite would provide the detail of soil moisture information on a daily basis may provide the data needed for real time forecasting.

==== Second phase (2003–2012) ====
Phase II, "Full Implementation" (2003–2012) of GEWEX is to "exploit new capabilities" developed during phase I such as new satellite information and, increasingly, new models. These include changes in the Earth's energy budget and water cycle, contribution of processes in climate feedback, causes of natural variability, predicting changes on seasonal or annual timescales, and how changes impact water resources. Phase II of is designed to be active models that have use to regional resource managers in real time. Some phases, such as the GAME (GEWEX Asia Monsoon Experiment) are already completed . GEWEX has become an umbrella program for the coordination of studies and experiments around the world. Reports from the phase I are still being produced and it will be some time before the results of the second phase are available. The experiment is still in progress.

== Panels ==
There are three panels in GEWEX: The Coordinated Energy and Water Cycle Observations Project (CEOP), GEWEX Radiation Panel (GRP), and GEWEX Modeling and Prediction Panel (GMPP).

=== Coordinated Energy and Water Cycle Observations Project ===
The Coordinated Energy and Water Cycle Observations Project (CEOP) is the largest of the panel projects. There are several regional project areas most of these are now covered by CEOP

==== Areas ====
For CEOP which survey the hydroclimate for southern African (AMMA), Baltic Sea area (BALTEX), North America (CPPA), Eastern Amazonia (LBA), La Plate Basin (LBB), Asia (MAHASRI), Australia (MDB), and Northern Eurasia (NEEPSI). In addition, CEOP coordinates the study of region types, such as cold, high altitude, monsoon, and semiarid climates and collects and formulates modelling on global, regional scale including land surface and surface hydrology modelling. Since GEWEX is an international cooperation it can utilize information from existing and planned satellites.

==== Objectives ====
The CEOP project has a number of energy budget and water cycle objectives. First is to produce more consistent research with better error definitions. Second is to better determine how energy flux and water cycles involve in feedback mechanisms. Third is to the predictability of important variables and improved parametric analysis to better model these processes. Fourth, to collaborate with other hydrological science projects to create tools for assessing the water-system consequences of predictions and global climate change.

Transformation of radiation that reaches the earth, the Red line indicates radiation that reaches the outer atmosphere, whereas the painted red area is the radiation as it reaches the surface, Aerosols can lower this even more

=== GEWEX Radiation Panel ===
GEWEX Radiation panel (GRP) is a collaborative organization with a goal of reviewing theoretical and experimental knowledge of radiative processes within the climate system. Sixty percent of the energy that comes to Earth from the Sun is transformed by the earth. The goals of this collaboration is to determine how energy is transformed as it inevitably is radiated back into space.

==== Global precipitation climatology project ====
GPCP task was to estimate precipitation using satellites that were global including places where people were not present to take measurements. Secondarily the project was tasked with studying regional precipitation on seasonal to between year time scales. As the study period of the project increased past 25 years a third objective was added analyze long-term variation, such as that caused by global warming. Also, in a renewed effort for better data and with more observation satellites, the GPCP, hopes to gain insights to rainfall variation on 'weather'-scale, or 4-hour periods to daily time scales.

===== Precipitation Assessment Group =====
The Precipitation Assessment Group was assigned by the panel to evaluate data on precipitation emphasizing data in the Global Precipitation Climatology Project (GPCP) product (GRP project). The GRP prepares to assimilate data from GPCP diurnal variation data for better estimation of the global precipitation products. The result of 25 years of measurement the global average precipitation rate is 2.61 mm per/day (about 0.1 inch/day) with about 1% uncertainty. The finding suggests there is no significant variation in mean annual rainfall. Regional variation was separated from land and ocean and the land variation of received precipitation was greater than the ocean. Satellites used to train the dataset analysis have the flaw of not having inaccurate measurements of drizzle and snow, and lack measurements in isolated places and over oceans. The rainfall maps show the greatest absolute rainfall error over the tropical oceans in regions with the highest estimated rainfall. The report self-critiques two aspects: the lack of polar-crossing satellites at the beginning of the study and the inability to correlate new information and older information (ground-based measurements). The noticeable trends in the dataset were deemed insignificant with regard to issues like global warming, but some stand-out positive trends over the Indopacific region were notable (Bay of Bengal and Indochina) and negative trends over South Central Africa.

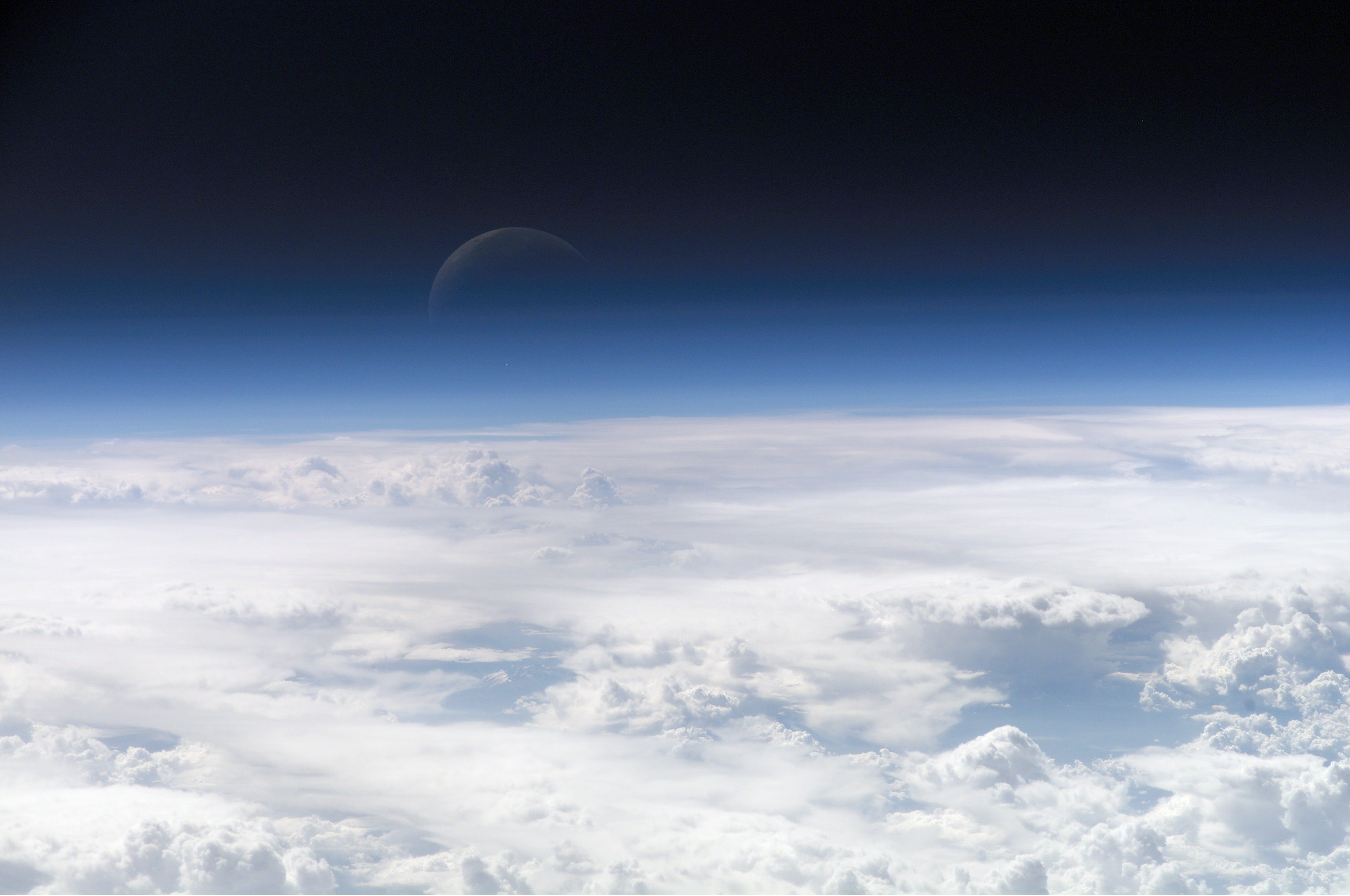
A goal of GEWEX is to monitor radiation that is released at the top of the atmosphere and model how energy flows from earth surfaces back into space.

==== Surface Radiation Budget project ====
The SRB project under NASA/GEWEX took global radiation measurements to determine radiative energy fluxes. The energy that comes from the sun strikes the atmosphere and scatters, clouds and is reflected, the earth or water where heat and light are radiated back into the atmosphere or space. When water is struck heated surface water can evaporate carrying energy back into space through cloud formation and rain. The SRB project measured these processes by measuring fluxes at the Earth's surface, top-of-atmosphere with shortwave (SW) and longwave (LW) radiation.

==== Baseline Surface Radiation Network ====
At the onset of GEWEX there was inadequate information on how radiation redistributed, both horizontally and vertically.

BSRN is a global system of less than 40 widely spread radiation measuring devices designed to measure changes in radiation at the Earth's surface. The information obtained is stored at the World Radiation Monitoring Center (WRMC) at the ETH (Zurich).

==== Global Aerosol Climatology Project ====
Established by Radiation Sciences Program(NASA) and GEWEX in 1998 to analyze satellite and field data to determine the distribution of aerosols, how they are formed, transformed and transported.

==== GEWEX Cloud Assessment Project ====
The GEWEX cloud assessment was initiated by the GEWEX Radiation Panel (GRP) in 2005 to evaluate the reliability of available, global, long-term cloud data products, with a special emphasis on ISCCP.

=== GEWEX Modeling and Prediction Panel ===
The GEWEX modelling and prediction panel (GMPP) is charged with the task of finding better ways to use the data by other projects and other agencies. It oversees GEWEX Atmospheric Boundary Layer Study (GABLS), GEWEX Cloud System Study (GCSS), and Global Land/Atmosphere System Study(GLASS). Climate forcing is a process of study which observes the contribution of irregular events, such a volcano eruption, greenhouse warming, solar variation, fluctuations in the Earth's orbit, long-term variation in the oceans circulation. The GMPP exploits these natural perturbations to test models developed that should predict what happens to global energy and water budgets with the perturbations.

==== GEWEX Atmospheric Boundary Layer Study ====
GEWEX Atmospheric Boundary Layer Study (GABLS) is a more recent addition to GEWEX. The study is tasked with understanding the physical properties of the atmospheric boundary layers for better models which include representation of boundary layers.

==== GEWEX Cloud System Study ====
GEWEX Cloud System Study (GCSS) task is to individualize modelling for different types of cloud systems. GCSS identifies 5 types of cloud systems:boundary layer, cirrus, extra tropical layer, precipitating convective, and polar. These cloud systems are generally too small to be rationalized in large scale climate modelling, this results in inadequate development of equations resulting in greater statistical uncertainty in results. In order to rationalize these processes, the study observes cloud systems at single fixed positions on earth in order to better estimate their parameters. These four areas are: Azores and Madeira Islands, Barbados, Equatorial Western Pacific, and Atlantic Tropics. The initial data collection is complete, methods developed for land and aircraft-based observations can be compared with satellite observations so that better models of cloud system identification can be made at smaller scales.

==== Global Land/Atmosphere System Study ====
Global Land/Atmosphere System Study (GLASS) tries to understand the impact on land surface parameters on the atmosphere. Changes in land as a result of natural and man-made activities results in the ability to alter the local climate and affect wind and cloud formation.

=== Critique ===
The period of the North Atlantic Oscillation lasts several times longer than the length of the proposed time frame of the GEWEX study

The GEWEX project has been in existence for over 30 years, and while some climate oscillations are short, such as El-Nino, some climate oscillations last for decades, such as the North Atlantic Oscillation. Some have proposed extrapolating pre-GEWEX information using new information and measurements taken with pre-GEWEX technology. The MAGS project, located in Northwestern Canada utilized indigenous peoples traditional experiences. In addition, in other parts of the GEWEX study, these oscillations are an aspect of climate forcing, which allow testing of predictions and models. This modelling may be complicated by the fact that the North Atlantic Oscillation in switching state (see graph) as the effects of global warming are becoming more prominent. For example, 2006 and 2007 saw one of the most dramatic declines in Arctic Sea ice, a decline that was largely unpredicted and can shift the late summer albedo in the northern hemisphere. In 2008, sea ice extent decline has backed off from the previous years' trend, and researchers had forecast a strong La Nina event for late 2007 and 2008. However, unexpectedly the surface temperatures in the Eastern Pacific have already begun to rise to El-Nino temperature ranges, indicating the La Nina event may terminate unexpectedly. With this, the loss of Northern Polar sea ice has begun to accelerate back toward the earlier trend. Such rapid and unexpected changes in climate-forcing events eventually suggest that modellers need to include parameters such as ocean temperature thermoclines, energy accumulation in the tropical oceans, sea ice extents in the polar regions, land glacial ice retraction in Greenland, and sheet ice and shelf ice remodelling in Antarctica. When multiple climate-forcing influences are acting simultaneously in which one of the events will eventually take dominance, lack of precedents from the past study of similar confluences of events, as well as knowledge of the uncertainty of sensitive 'switches' in the oceanic/atmospheric switches may affect the ability to provide accurate models and predictions. In addition, sampling points may be spread to monitor leading indicators in one common scenario may be useless during an oscillation where the pool of energy shifts to an unmonitored region so that the magnitude of the shift avoids computation.

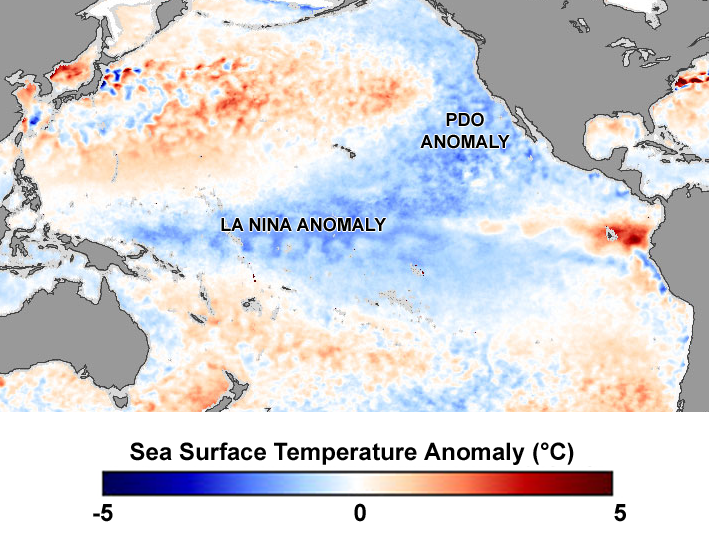
Anomalies in April 2008. Note while the central Pacific tropics are under La-Nina, the Eastern Pacific is warming

An example of climate-forcing anomalies might be used to describe the events of 1998 to 2002, a strong El-Nino/La Nina cycle. The onset of the cycle can be influenced by global warming, which facilitated a larger increase of warm water in the tropics, rapidly enough that the thermocline was tolerant. A thermocline is a sharp temperature drop at depth; it varies during the year, with location, and over long periods of time. As the thermocline depth increases El-Nino events are more likely; however, during the peak of the event energy is dissipated and the thermocline decreases depth, possibly to below normal levels so the a strong La-Nina event can results. The world's oceans, particularly the depths of the Atlantic, are believed to be a sink for CO_{2} that is adsorbed at the polar regions, as this builds into the Pacific the upwelling and warming of water can bring CO_{2}-rich waters trapped in the cold pressurized bottom layers to the surface. Local increases of CO_{2} occur which allow more heat-trapping; the La-Nina may be mild or aborted early in the process. However, if the return of the thermocline has enough momentum it could propel a strong La-Nina event that last for a few years. However, rapid cooling in the Arctic can allow for more CO_{2} trapping and offset release of CO_{2} during La-Nina in a specific area. The Pacific Decadal Anomaly (PDA See image) may influence the source, direction or momentum of rise of the cold water component of the thermocline. The extent and duration of the PDA are yet unpredictable, and its modulating effects on El-Nino/La-Nina patterns can only be speculated. These unknowns affect the ability for climate modellers to predict and indicate climate-forcing models need to accurate a wider sampling of data to be predictive.

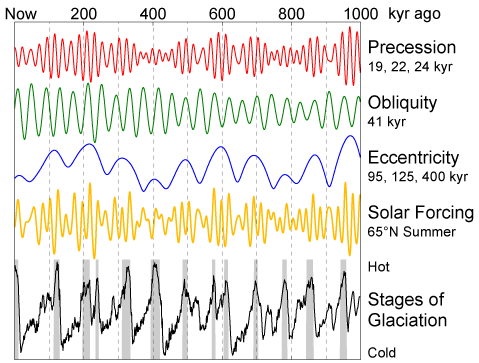
Scientist still don't know which of these cycles determines the onset of ice-ages and interglacial, were we headed into an ice-age or 50,000 years from now, see Milankovitch cycles

There are also longer-term cycles, the mini ice-age that preceded the medieval warm period may have been a transition to an ice age, the last ice-age lasted from ~130,000 years ago until the onset of the Holocene. This ice-age may have been aborted by other factors including global warming. Such a stalling of long-term cycles is believed to be a factor in the Dryas period, a warming interrupted by surface impacts of extraterrestrial origin may have occurred over hundreds of years. But the anthropogenic greenhouse effects and changing insolation patterns may have unpredictable long-term effects. Reductions of glacial ice on land masses can cause isostatic rebounds and may affect earthquakes and volcanism over a wide range. Rising sea levels can also affect patterns, and was seen in Indonesia, simply drilling a gas well in the wrong place may have touched off a mud volcano and there are some signs that this may precede a new caldera formation for a volcano. Over the very long term, the change in temperature of the Earth's crust on geothermal and volcanic processes is unknown. How this plays into climate-forcing events with magnitudes that are unpredictable is unknown.

The critiques at GEWEX can only be thrust at current results, which have added much more information about climate modelling that have created critiques, the major thrust of modelling was originally intended to be part of Phase II which will, after 4 years, produce its results. One of the major critiques of GEWEX phase I was land-based measurements, which are now increasing. The other major critique is the inability to capture decadal rainfall events, events that frequently occur over a few hours. Therefore, more measurements documenting shorter time frames may provide essential data for almost continuous data set. Therefore, Phase II is mainly modelling with addition of more data as deemed lacking in Phase I. Many of the critiques above may be compensated for with better data requiring better models including insolation and changes in reflection. The problem with variation in ocean currents, particular with respect to thermocline depths requires more oceanography as part of the project, as with losses of ice and changes of climate on the ice edges.
