= Common modeling infrastructure =

Common modeling infrastructure refers to software libraries that can be shared across multiple institutions in order to increase software reuse and interoperability in complex modeling systems. Early initiatives were in the climate and weather domain, where software components representing distinct physical domains (for example, ocean or atmosphere) tended to be developed by domain specialists, often at different organizations. In order to create complete applications, these needed to be combined, using for instance a general circulation model, that transfers data between different components. An additional challenge is that these models generally require supercomputers to run, to account for the collected data and for data analyses. Thus, it was important to provide an efficient massively parallel computer system, and the processing hardware and software, to account for all the different workloads and communication channels.

== General ==
Common modeling infrastructure projects include the Network Common Data Form (NetCDF) library, the Spherical Coordinate Remapping and Interpolation Package (SCRIP), the Flexible Modeling System (FMS), the OASIS coupler developed at CERFACS, and the multi-agency Earth System Modeling Framework (ESMF).

The Earth System Modeling Framework (ESMF) is considered a technical layer, integrated into a common modeling infrastructure. Other aspects of interoperability and shared infrastructure include: common experimental protocols, common analytic methods, common documentation standards for data and data provenance, shared workflow, and shared model components.

== History ==
In the late 1990s and early 2000s, a series of journal papers and government reports described common modeling infrastructure as necessary to the competitiveness and evolution of the U.S. Earth science modeling community. These reports resulted in a number of new community projects. The Earth System Modeling Framework (ESMF) and the Earth System Modeling (ESM) are two of the largest modeling approaches. Similar projects were initiated in related domains, including the Space Weather Modeling Framework (SWMF/CESM), to study conditions including the Sun, solar wind, magnetosphere, ionosphere, and thermosphere that potentially can influence performance and reliability of space-borne and ground-based technological systems or can endanger human life or health.

== See also ==
- Climate model
- Earth System Modeling Framework
