= Goddard Earth Observing System =

Integrated Earth system model and data assimilation system developed at NASA's GMAO

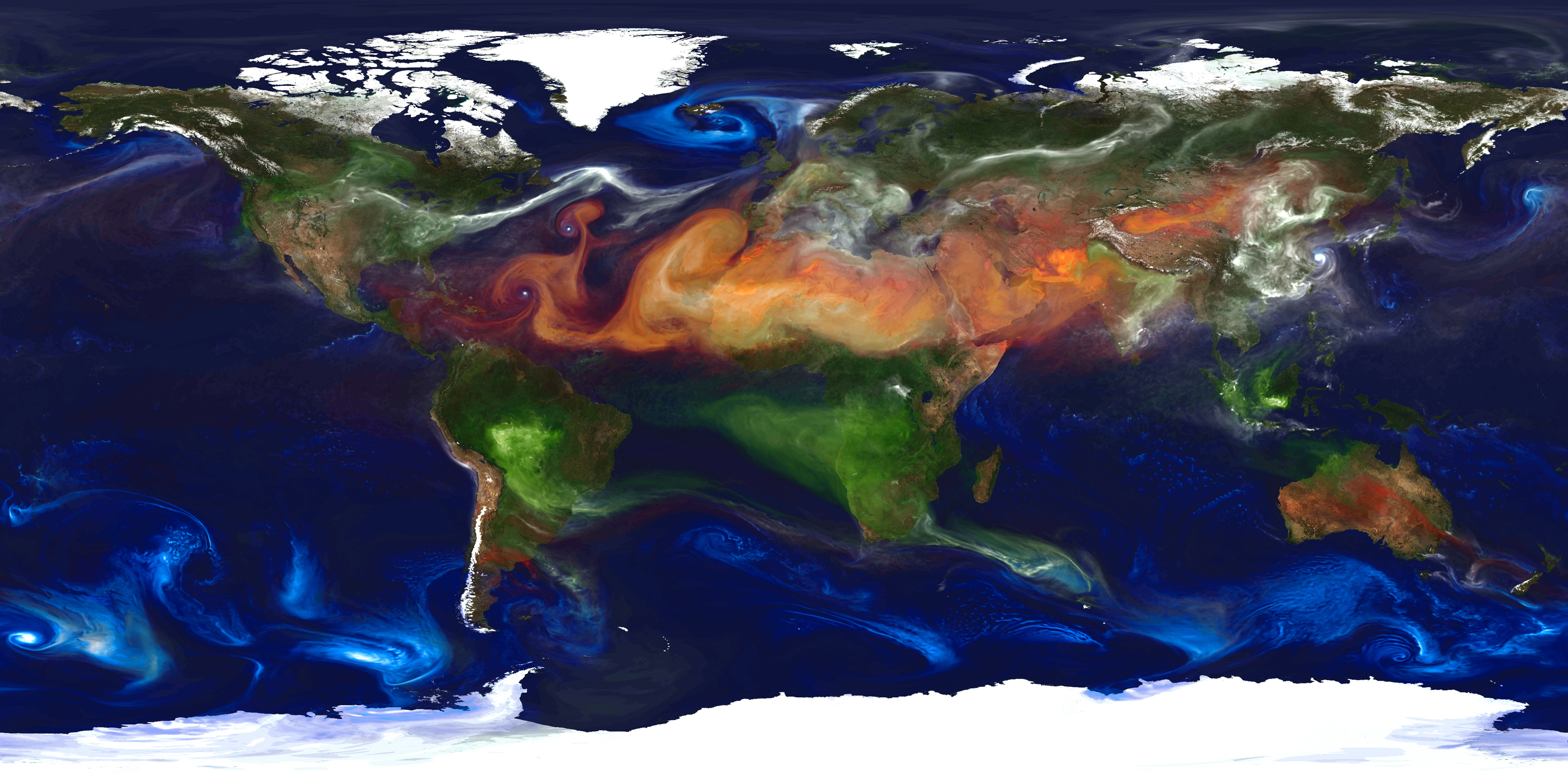
GEOS-5 simulation depicting the global distribution of atmospheric aerosols: desert dust (orange), sea salt (blue), wildfire smoke (green), and sulfate particles (white)

The Goddard Earth Observing System (GEOS) is an Earth system model and data assimilation system developed at the Global Modeling and Assimilation Office (GMAO) at NASA's Goddard Space Flight Center. The model uses the Earth System Modeling Framework (ESMF), enabling a modular and flexible approach and the investigation of many different aspects of Earth science. In particular, questions related to coupled processes involving the atmosphere, ocean, and/or land have been researched using GEOS. This work spans a range of spatiotemporal scales and include the representation of dynamical, physical, chemical and biological processes.

== Forecasting ==
Two versions of GEOS are used to create forecasts multiple times a day: GEOS "Forward Processing" (GEOS-FP) creates weather forecasts and analyses and GEOS "Composition Forecast" (GEOS-CF) generates forecasts of atmospheric gasses and aerosols.

== MERRA-2 ==
GEOS is used to create the widely used atmospheric reanalysis Modern-Era Retrospective analysis for Research and Applications, Version 2 (MERRA-2). MERRA-2 provides weather and aerosol data starting in 1980. It has been used in research ranging from atmospheric science to public health.
