= CLIVAR =

Component of the World Climate Research Programme

CLIVAR (climate and ocean: variability, predictability and change) is one of six projects of the World Climate Research Programme. Its purpose is to describe and understand climate variability and predictability on seasonal to centennial time-scales, identify the physical processes responsible for climate change and develop modeling and predictive capabilities for climate modelling.

== History ==
The following is an approximate timeline of CLIVAR and its precedents:

- 1985: The World Climate Research Programme (WCRP) initiated the TOGA (Tropical-Ocean Global Atmosphere Project) (1985-1995) to study interannual variability driven by the ocean-atmosphere system in the tropics.
- 1990: The WCRP began the first observational phase of the World Ocean Circulation Experiment (1990-1997)
- 1991: The Joint Scientific Committee (JSC) of the WCRP called on a group of experts to come together and consider the possible future directions for climate research, building on the foundation laid by TOGA and WOCE.
- 1992: The deliberations of the Joint Scientific Committee were published in 1992 in a brochure entitled ‘CLIVAR – a study of Climate Variability and Predictability’.
- 1993: The WCRP JSC decided to undertake CLIVAR as a major activity.
- 1995: CLIVAR was officially launched, initially as a 15-year project. The launch coincided with the end of TOGA.
- 1997: The first CLIVAR implementation plan was published.

== Panels and working groups ==
CLIVAR has a number of panels and working groups based on the study of climate variability and predictability of different components of the global climate system.

=== Global panels ===
CLIVAR has four global panels:

- Global Synthesis and Observation Panel
- Climate Dynamics Panel
- Ocean Model Development Panel
- CLIVAR/GEWEX Monsoons Panel

=== Regional panels ===
Regional panels focus on specific aspects of the climate system. Since the different regions of the ocean are qualitatively different, and given the important role of the oceans in controlling climate over the interannual, decadal, and centennial scales considered by CLIVAR, the subdivision into panels is largely based on regions of the ocean system:

- Atlantic Region Panel
- CLIVAR /CliC Northern Oceans Region Panel
- CLIVAR/CliC/SCAR Southern Ocean Region Panel
- CLIVAR/IOC-GOOS Indian Ocean Region Panel
- Pacific Region Panel

=== Research foci ===
CLIVAR RFs are temporary 3-5 years groups that drive priority climate research through bottom-up efforts, foster cross-panel and WCRP-wide collaboration, and engage new scientists. The current RFs are:

- Tropical Basin Interaction
- Marine Heatwaves in the Global Ocean

== See also ==
- VAMOS Ocean-Cloud-Atmosphere-Land Study
