= Atmospheric Model Intercomparison Project =

Atmospheric Model Intercomparison Project (AMIP) is a standard experimental protocol for global atmospheric general circulation models (AGCMs). It provides a community-based infrastructure in support of climate model diagnosis, validation, intercomparison, documentation and data access. Virtually the entire international climate modeling community has participated in this project since its inception in 1990.

AMIP is endorsed by the Working Group on Numerical Experimentation (WGNE) of the World Climate Research Programme, and is managed by the Program for Climate Model Diagnosis and Intercomparison with the guidance of the WGNE AMIP Panel.

The AMIP experiment itself is simple by design; an AGCM is constrained by realistic sea surface temperature and sea ice from 1979 to near present, with a comprehensive set of fields saved for diagnostic research.

This model configuration removes the added complexity of ocean-atmosphere feedbacks in the climate system. It is not meant to be used for climate change prediction, an endeavor that requires a coupled atmosphere-ocean model (e.g., see AMIP's sister project CMIP).

== See also ==
- Climate model
