= Coupled Model Intercomparison Project =

Collaboration for climate change study

In climatology, the Coupled Model Intercomparison Project (CMIP) is a collaborative framework designed to improve knowledge of climate change. It was organized in 1995 by the Working Group on Coupled Modelling (WGCM) of the World Climate Research Programme (WCRP). It is developed in phases to foster the climate model improvements but also to support national and international assessments of climate change. A related project is the Atmospheric Model Intercomparison Project (AMIP) for global coupled ocean-atmosphere general circulation models (GCMs).

Coupled models are computer-based models of the Earth's climate, in which models of different subsystems (such as the atmosphere, oceans, land, ice) are "coupled" together, and interact in simulations.

== CMIP phases ==
The Program for Climate Model Diagnosis and Intercomparison (PCMDI) at Lawrence Livermore National Laboratory has been supporting the several CMIP phases by helping WGCM to determine the scope of the project, by maintaining the project's data base and by participating in data analysis. CMIP has received model output from the pre-industrial climate simulations ("control runs") and 1% per year increasing-CO_{2} simulations of about 30 coupled GCMs. Some phases of the project,

including 20th Century Climate in Coupled Models (20C3M), include more realistic scenarios of climate forcing for both historical, paleoclimate and future scenarios.

=== CMIP Phases 1 and 2 ===
The response to the CMIP1 announcement was very successful and up to 18 global coupled models participated in the data collection representing most of the international groups with global coupled GCMs. In consequence, at the September 1996 meeting of the CLIVAR NEG2 numerical experimentation group in Victoria, Canada, it was decided that CMIP2 will be an inter-comparison of 1% per year compound CO_{2} increase integrations (80 years in length) where CO_{2} doubles at around year 70.

=== CMIP Phase 3 ===
During 2005 and 2006, a collection of climate model outputs was coordinated and stored by PCMDI. The climate model outputs included simulations of past, present and future climate scenarios. This activity enabled those climate models, outside the major modeling centers to perform research of relevance to climate scientists preparing the IPCC Fourth Assessment Report (IPCC-AR4). For the CMIP3 a list of 20 different experiments were proposed, and the PCMDI kept the documentation of all the global climate model involved. Additional information and data-sets are in.

=== CMIP Phase 5 ===
The next phase of the project (2010–2014) was CMIP5. CMIP5 included more metadata describing model simulations than previous phases. The METAFOR project created an exhaustive schema describing the scientific, technical, and numerical aspects of CMIP runs which was archived along with the output data.

A main objective of the CMIP5 experiments was to address outstanding scientific questions that arose as part of the IPCC AR4 process, improve understanding of climate, and to provide estimates of future climate change that will be useful to those considering its possible consequences. The IPCC Fifth Assessment Report summarizes information of CMIP5 experiments, while the CMIP5 experimental protocol was endorsed by the 12th Session of the WCRP Working on this Group on Coupled Modelling (WGCM). Additional information and data-sets are in.

=== CMIP Phase 6 ===
SSP-RF scenario matrix, utilizing CMIP6

Planning meetings for Phase 6 began in 2013, and an overview of the design and organization was published in 2016. By 2018 CMIP6 had endorsed 23 Model Intercomparison Projects (MIPs) involving 33 modeling groups in 16 countries. A small number of common experiments were also planned. The deadline for submission of papers to contribute to the IPCC 6th Assessment Report Working Group I is early 2020.

The structure of the CMIP6 has been extended with respect to CMIP5 by providing an equivalent framework named CMIP Diagnostic, Evaluation and Characterization of Klima (DECK) (klima is Greek for "climate"), together with a set of Endorsed MIPs to improve the description of aspects of climate models beyond the core set of common experiments included in DECK. However, CMIP-Endorsed Model Intercomparison Projects (MIPs) are still built on the DECK and CMIP historical simulations, therefore their main goal is just to address a wider range of specific questions. This structure will be kept in future CMIP experiments.

CMIP6 also aims to be consistent regarding common standards and documentation. To achieve that it includes methods to facilitate a wider distribution and characterization of model outputs, and common standard tools for their analyses. A number of guides has been created for data managers, modelers and users.

A set of official/common forcings datasets are available for the studies under DECK, as well as several MIPS. That allows for more sensible comparisons on the model ensemble created under the CMIP6 umbrella.

These common dataset forcings are stored and coordinated by input4MIPS (input datasets for Model Intercomparison Projects).

- Historical Short-Lived Climate Forcers (SLCF) and greenhouse gas (CO_{2} and CH_{4}) Emissions
- Biomass Burning Emissions
- Global Gridded Land-use Forcing Datasets
- Historical greenhouse gases concentrations: a full description is published via the CMIP6 Special Issue publication
- Ozone Concentrations and Nitrogen (N)-Deposition; description of ozone radiative forcing based on this dataset is published.
- Aerosol Optical Properties and Relative Change in Cloud Droplet Number Concentration
- Solar Forcing:
- Stratospheric Aerosol Data Set
- AMIP Sea Surface Temperature and Sea Ice Datasets

Beyond these historical forcings, CMIP6 also has a common set of future scenarios comprising land use and emissions as required for the future Shared Socioeconomic Pathways (SSPs) which have replaced the Representative Concentration Pathways (RCPs) from prior models.

=== CMIP Phase 7 ===
First data is expected end-2025. For CMIP7 a more continuous release approach than in previous phases was announced: In addition to DECK releases and a growing number of community MIPS, so-called fast track experiments supporting specific requirements will be released.

== See also ==
- Climate model
- Intergovernmental Panel on Climate Change
- Representative Concentration Pathway
- Shared Socioeconomic Pathways
