= World Climate Research Programme =

Climatological research organization

- Abbreviation: WCRP
- Formation: 1980; 46 years ago
- Type: INGO
- Region served: Worldwide
- Official language: English
- Parent organization: The World Meteorological Organization, the International Council for Science and the Intergovernmental Oceanographic Commission
- Website: wcrp-climate.org

The World Climate Research Programme (WCRP) is an international programme that helps to coordinate global climate research. The WCRP was established in 1980, under the joint sponsorship of the World Meteorological Organization (WMO) and the International Council for Science (ICSU), and has also been sponsored by the Intergovernmental Oceanographic Commission (IOC) of UNESCO since 1993.

The programme is funded by its three sponsors and additional contributions by nation states or other donors. WCRP uses these funds to organize science workshops or conferences and support collaboration between climate scientists at an international level. Its expert groups also develop international standards for climate data and propose future emphasis areas in international climate research, among others.

== History ==
The World Climate Research Programme (WCRP) came into existence in 1980, with the International Science Council (ISC)—known as the International Council for Science (ICSU) until its reorganization in July 2018—and the World Meteorological Organization (WMO) acting as its founding sponsors. The sponsorship circle widened in 1993 when the Intergovernmental Oceanographic Commission (IOC) of UNESCO joined as a sponsor.

Over a span of more than 40 years, the WCRP has been instrumental in propelling the advancement of climate science. It has fostered the ability of climate scientists to monitor, simulate, and forecast the global climate with unparalleled accuracy. This has led to the provision of essential climate information that aids policy and decision-making, as well as supports various practical applications for end-users across multiple sectors. The significance of the WCRP's contributions is documented in celebratory publications such as the "25th Anniversary Brochure," the "WCRP Film: 40 years of international climate science," and articles like "The World Climate Research Programme (WCRP) celebrates its 40th anniversary."

== Mandate ==
WCRP's objective is stated as "a better understanding of the climate system and the causes of climate variability and change" and "to determine the predictability of climate; and to determine the effect of human activities on climate". In practice, the programme aims to foster initiatives in climate research which require or benefit from international coordination and which are unlikely to emerge from national efforts alone. The programme does not fund climate research directly, but may at times exchange views with research funding agencies on global research priorities.

== Structure ==
The largest group of contributors to WCRP are several thousands of climate scientists from around the world who offer their expertise and time as volunteers to, for example, help organize workshops in key areas of research, lay out avenues for future research in white paper articles, and serve on WCRP science or advisory boards. Official scientific guidance for the programme is provided by a Joint Scientific Committee (JSC) consisting of 18 volunteer scientists selected by mutual agreement between the three sponsoring organizations. Everyday operations are supported by a secretariat of around 8 full-time staff, hosted by the World Meteorological Organization in Geneva.

== Activities and projects ==
WCRP's largest activities are its four "Core Projects" (called SPARC, CLIVAR, CliC, and GEWEX), which support climate research on the global atmosphere, oceans, the cryosphere, and the land surface (together constituting the Earth's physical climate system) as well as interactions and exchanges between them. Each Core Project again has a structure similar to that of WCRP itself, namely contributing scientists, a scientific steering group, and a secretariat ("international project office") hosted by individual countries.

The programme further maintains topical working groups and advisory councils on climate data, climate modelling, subseasonal-to-decadal climate prediction, and regional climate modelling. Additional "Grand Challenges" target specific questions of societal interest within climate science.

One particular output by a WCRP task team is the Coupled Model Intercomparison Project, which standardizes and coordinates regular comparisons of the world's climate models and which provides an important basis for the IPCC Assessment Reports' climate projections.

=== Stratospheric Processes And their Role in Climate ===
Stratosphere-troposphere Processes and their Role in Climate (SPARC) is a core project of the programme. Founded in 1992, SPARC has coordinated high-level research activities related to understanding Earth system processes for over two decades. More specifically, SPARC promotes and facilitates cutting-edge international research activities on how chemical and physical processes in the atmosphere interact with climate and climate change.

=== Previous Programs ===
- World Ocean Circulation Experiment (1990 - 2002): An oceanographic campaign to explore and develop ocean models, including collecting data and standardizing acquisition processes, and to look at long-term ocean circulation behaviors.

== See also ==
- World Meteorological Organization (WMO)
- International Council for Science (ICSU)
- Intergovernmental Oceanographic Commission (IOC/UNESCO)
- Coupled model intercomparison project (CMIP)
- Tropical Ocean-Global Atmosphere program (TOGA)
- Global Climate Observing System (GCOS)
- Future Earth
- Group on Earth Observations (GEO)
- Intergovernmental Panel on Climate Change (IPCC)
