= Global Climate Coalition =

Lobbyist group against reduction of greenhouse gas emissions

- Abbreviation: GCC
- Formation: 1989; 37 years ago
- Dissolved: 2001; 25 years ago
- Type: Advocacy group
- Legal status: Nonprofit
- Headquarters: Washington, D.C., U.S.
- Website: As of 2006 at Internet Archive

The Global Climate Coalition (GCC) (1989–2001) was an international lobbyist group of businesses that opposed action to reduce greenhouse gas emissions and engaged in climate change denial, publicly challenging the science behind global warming. The GCC was the largest industry group active in climate policy and the most prominent industry advocate in international climate negotiations. The GCC was involved in opposition to the Kyoto Protocol, and played a role in blocking ratification by the United States. The coalition knew it could not deny the scientific consensus, but sought to sow doubt over the scientific consensus on climate change and create manufactured controversy.

The Global Climate Coalition (GCC) was formed in 1989 as a project under the auspices of the National Association of Manufacturers. The GCC was formed to represent the interests of the major producers and users of fossil fuels, to oppose regulation to mitigate global warming and to challenge the science behind global warming.

The GCC was dissolved in 2001 after membership declined in the face of improved understanding of the role of greenhouse gases in climate change and of public criticism. It declared that its primary objective had been achieved: U.S. President George W. Bush withdrew the U.S., which alone accounted for nearly a quarter of the world's greenhouse gas emissions, from the Kyoto Protocol process through the Senate voting to not ratify the treaty. Thus, this rendered mandatory global reductions unreachable.

== Founding ==
The Global Climate Coalition (GCC) was formed in 1989 as a project under the auspices of the National Association of Manufacturers. The GCC was formed to represent the interests of the major producers and users of fossil fuels, to oppose regulation to mitigate global warming, and to challenge the science behind global warming. Context for the founding of the GCC from 1988 included the establishment of the Intergovernmental Panel on Climate Change (IPCC) and NASA climatologist James Hansen's congressional testimony that climate change was occurring. The government affairs' offices of five or six corporations recognized that they had been inadequately organized for the Montreal Protocol, the international treaty that phased out ozone depleting chlorofluorocarbons, and the Clean Air Act in the United States, and recognized that fossil fuels would be targeted for regulation.

According to GCC's mission statement on the home page of its website, GCC was established: "to coordinate business participation in the international policy debate on the issue of global climate change and global warming," and GCC's executive director in a 1993 press release said GCC was organized "as the leading voice for industry on the global climate change issue."

GCC reorganized independently in 1992, with the first chairman of the board of directors being the director of government relations for the Phillips Petroleum Company. Exxon, later ExxonMobil, was a founding member, and a founding member of the GCC's board of directors; the energy giant also had a leadership role in coalition. The American Petroleum Institute (API) was a leading member of the coalition. API's executive vice president was a chairman of the coalition's board of directors. Other GCC founding members included the National Coal Association, United States Chamber of Commerce, American Forest & Paper Association, and Edison Electric Institute. GCC's executive director John Shlaes was previously the director of government relations at the Edison Electric Institute. GCC was run by Ruder Finn, a public relations firm. GCC's comprehensive PR campaign was designed by E. Bruce Harrison, who had been creating campaigns for the US industry against environmental legislation from the 1970s.

GCC was the largest industry group active in climate policy. About 40 companies and industry associations were GCC members. Considering member corporations, member trade associations, and business represented by member trade associations, GCC represented over 230,000 businesses. Industry sectors represented included: aluminium, paper, transportation, power generation, petroleum, chemical, and small businesses. All major oil companies were members until 1996 (Shell left in 1998). GCC members were from industries that would have been adversely effected by limitations on fossil fuel consumption. GCC was funded by membership dues.

== Advocacy activities ==
GCC was one of the most powerful lobbyist groups against action to mitigate global warming. It was the most prominent industry advocate in international climate negotiations, and led a campaign opposed to policies to reduce greenhouse gas emissions. The GCC was one of the most powerful non-governmental organizations representing business interests in climate policy, according to Kal Raustiala, professor at the UCLA School of Law.

GCC's advocacy activities included lobbying government officials, grassroots lobbying through press releases and advertising, participation in international climate conferences, criticism of the processes of international climate organizations, critiques of climate models, and personal attacks on scientists and environmentalists. Policy positions advocated by the coalition included denial of anthropogenic climate change, emphasizing the uncertainty in climatology, advocating for additional research, highlighting the benefits and downplaying the risks of climate change, stressing the priority of economic development, defending national sovereignty, and opposition to the regulation of greenhouse gas emissions.

GCC sent delegations to all of the major international climate conventions. Only nations and non-profits may send official delegates to the United Nations Climate Change conferences. GCC registered with the United Nations Framework Convention on Climate Change (UNFCCC) as a non-governmental organization, and executives from GCC members attended official UN conferences as GCC delegates.

In 1990, after US president, George H. W. Bush, addressed the Intergovernmental Panel on Climate Change (IPCC) urging caution in responding to global warming, and offering no new proposals, GCC said Bush's speech was "very strong" and concurred with the priorities of economic development and additional research. GCC sent 30 attendees to the 1992 Earth Summit in Rio de Janeiro, where it lobbied to keep targets and timetables out of the Framework Convention on Climate Change. In December, 1992 GCC's executive director wrote in a letter to The New York Times: "...there is considerable debate on whether or not man-made greenhouse gases (produced primarily by burning fossil fuels) are triggering a dangerous 'global warming' trend." In 1992 GCC distributed a half-hour video entitled The Greening of Planet Earth, to hundreds of journalists, the White House, and several Middle Eastern oil-producing countries, which suggested that increasing atmospheric carbon dioxide could boost crop yields and solve world hunger.

In 1993, after then US president Bill Clinton pledged "to reducing our emissions of greenhouse gases to their 1990 levels by the year 2000," GCC's executive director said it "could jeopardize the economic health of the nation." GCC's lobbying was key to the defeat in the United States Senate of Clinton's 1993 BTU tax proposal. In 1994, after United States Secretary of Energy Hazel R. O'Leary said the 1992 UNFCCC needed to be strengthened, and that voluntary carbon dioxide reductions may not be enough, GCC said it was: "disturbed by the implication that the President's voluntary climate action plan, which is just getting under way, will be inadequate and that more stringent measures may be needed domestically."

GCC did not fund original scientific research and its climate claims relied largely on the World Climate Review and its successor the World Climate Report edited by Patrick Michaels and funded by the Western Fuels Association. GCC promoted the views of climate deniers such as Michaels, Fred Singer, and Richard Lindzen. In 1996, GCC published a report entitled Global warming and extreme weather: fact vs. fiction written by Robert E. Davis.

GCC members questioned the efficacy of climate change denial and shifted their message to highlighting the economic costs of proposed greenhouse gas emission regulations and the limited effectiveness of proposals exempting developing nations. In 1995, after the United Nations Climate Change conference in Berlin agreed to negotiate greenhouse gas emission limits, GCC's executive director said the agreement gave "developing countries like China, India and Mexico a free ride" and would "change the relations between sovereign countries and the United Nations. This could have very significant implications. It could be a way of capping our economy." At a Washington, D.C. press conference on the eve of the second United Nations Climate Change conference in Geneva, GCC's executive director said, "The time for decision is not yet now." At the conference in Geneva, GCC issued a statement that said it was too early to determine the causes of global warming. GCC representatives lobbied scientists at the September, 1996 IPCC conference in Mexico City.

After actor Leonardo DiCaprio, chairman of Earth Day 2000, interviewed Clinton for ABC News, GCC sent out an e-mail that said that DiCaprio's first car was a Jeep Grand Cherokee and that his current car was a Chevrolet Tahoe.

=== Predicting Future Climate Change: A Primer ===
In 1995, GCC assembled an advisory committee of scientific and technical experts to compile an internal-only, 17-page report on climate science entitled Predicting Future Climate Change: A Primer, which said: "The scientific basis for the Greenhouse Effect and the potential impact of human emissions of greenhouse gases such as CO2 on climate is well established and cannot be denied." In early 1996, GCC's operating committee asked the advisory committee to redact the sections that rebutted contrarian arguments, and accepted the report and distributed it to members. The draft document was disclosed in a 2007 lawsuit filed by the auto industry against California's efforts to regulate automotive greenhouse gas emissions.

According to The New York Times, the primer demonstrated that "even as the coalition worked to sway opinion, its own scientific and technical experts were advising that the science backing the role of greenhouse gases in global warming could not be refuted." According to the Union of Concerned Scientists in 2015, the primer was: "remarkable for indisputably showing that, while some fossil fuel companies' deception about climate science has continued to the present day, at least two decades ago the companies' own scientific experts were internally alerting them about the realities and implications of climate change."

=== IPCC Second Assessment Report ===
GCC was an industry participant in the review process of the IPCC Second Assessment Report. In 1996, prior to the publication of the Second Assessment Report, GCC distributed a report entitled The IPCC: Institutionalized Scientific Cleansing to reporters, US Congressmen, and scientists. The coalition report said that Benjamin D. Santer, the lead author of Chapter 8 in the assessment, entitled "Detection of Climate Change and Attribution of Causes," had altered the text, after acceptance by the Working Group, and without approval of the authors, to strike content characterizing the uncertainty of the science. Frederick Seitz repeated GCC's charges in a letter to The Wall Street Journal published June 12, 1996. The coalition ran newspaper advertisements that said: "unless the management of the IPCC promptly undertakes to republish the printed versions ... the IPCC's credibility will have been lost."

Santer and his co-authors said the edits were integrations of comments from peer review as per agreed IPCC processes.

=== Opposition to Kyoto Protocol ===
GCC was the main industry group in the United States opposed to the Kyoto Protocol, which committed signatories to reduce greenhouse gas emissions. The coalition "was the leading industry group working in opposition to the Kyoto Protocol," according to Greenpeace, and led opposition to the Kyoto Protocol, according to the Los Angeles Times.

Prior to 1997, GCC spent about $1 million annually lobbying against limits on CO_{2} emissions; before Kyoto, GCC annual revenue peaked around $1.5 million; GCC spent $13 million on advertising in opposition to the Kyoto treaty. The coalition funded the Global Climate Information Project and hired the advertising firm that produced the 1993–1994 Harry and Louise advertising campaign which opposed Clinton's health care initiative. The advertisements said, "the UN Climate Treaty isn't Global...and it won't work" and "Americans will pay the price...50 cents more for every gallon of gasoline."

GCC opposed the signing of the Kyoto Protocol by Clinton. GCC was influential in the withdrawal from the Kyoto Protocol by the administration of President George W. Bush. According to briefing notes prepared by the United States Department of State for the under-secretary of state, Bush's rejection of the Kyoto Protocol was "in part based on input from" GCC. GCC lobbying was key to the July, 1997 unanimous passage in the United States Senate of the Byrd–Hagel Resolution, which reflected the coalition's position that restrictions on greenhouse gas emissions must include developing countries. GCC's chairman told a US congressional committee that mandatory greenhouse gas emissions limits were: "an unjustified rush to judgement." The coalition sent 50 delegates to the third Conference of the Parties to the United Nations Climate Change Conference in Kyoto. On December 11, 1997, the day the Kyoto delegates reached agreement on legally binding limits on greenhouse gas emissions, GCC's chairman said the agreement would be defeated by the US Senate. In 2001, GCC's executive director compared the Kyoto Protocol to the RMS Titanic.

== Membership decline ==
GCC's challenge to science prompted a backlash from environmental groups. Environmentalists described GCC as a "club for polluters" and called for members to withdraw their support. "Abandonment of the Global Climate Coalition by leading companies is partly in response to the mounting evidence that the world is indeed getting warmer," according to environmentalist Lester R. Brown. In 1998, Green Party delegates to the European Parliament introduced an unsuccessful proposal that the World Meteorological Organization name hurricanes after GCC members. Defections weakened the coalition. In 1996, British Petroleum resigned and later announced support for the Kyoto Protocol and commitment to greenhouse gas emission reductions. In 1997, Royal Dutch Shell withdrew after criticism from European environmental groups. In 1999, Ford Motor Company was the first US company to withdraw; the New York Times described the departure as "the latest sign of divisions within heavy industry over how to respond to global warming." DuPont left the coalition in 1997 and Shell USA (then known as Shell Oil Company) left in 1998. In 2000, GCC corporate members were the targets of a national student-run university divestiture campaign. Between December, 1999 and early March, 2000, Texaco, the Southern Company, General Motors and Daimler-Chrysler withdrew. Some former coalition members joined the Business Environmental Leadership Council within the Pew Center on Global Climate Change which represented diverse stakeholders, including business interests, with a commitment to peer-reviewed scientific research and accepted the need for emissions restrictions to address climate change.

In 2000, GCC restructured as an association of trade associations; membership was limited to trade associations, and individual corporations were represented through their trade association. Brown called the restructuring "a thinly veiled effort to conceal the real issue – the loss of so many key corporate members."

== Dissolution ==
After US President George W. Bush withdrew the US from the Kyoto process in 2001, GCC disbanded. Absent the participation of the US, the effectiveness of the Kyoto process was limited. GCC said on its website that its mission had been successfully achieved, writing "At this point, both Congress and the Administration agree that the U.S. should not accept the mandatory cuts in emissions required by the protocol." Networks of well-funded industry lobbyists and other climate change denial groups continue its work.

== Reception ==
In 2015, the Union of Concerned Scientists compared GCC's role in the public policy debate on climate change to the roles in the public policy debate on tobacco safety of the Tobacco Institute, the tobacco industry's lobbyist group, and the Council for Tobacco Research, which promoted misleading science. Environmentalist Bill McKibben said that, by promoting doubt about the science, "throughout the 1990s, even as other nations took action, the fossil fuel industry's Global Climate Coalition managed to make American journalists treat the accelerating warming as a he-said-she-said story." According to the Los Angeles Times, GCC members integrated projections from climate models into their operational planning while publicly criticising the models.

Former Vice President Al Gore described the oil companies' blocking campaign as "the most serious crime of the post-World War Two era".

== Members ==
- American Electric Power (Note: McGregor 2008: 1992 board of directors)
- American Farm Bureau Federation
- American Highway Users Alliance
- American Iron and Steel Institute
- American Paper Institute, later American Forest & Paper Association
- American Petroleum Institute
- Amoco
- ARCO
- Association of American Railroads
- Association of International Automobile Manufacturers
- British Petroleum
- Chemical Manufacturers Association, later American Chemistry Council
- Chevron
- DaimlerChrysler
- Dow Chemical Company
- DuPont
- Edison Electric Institute
- Enron
- ExxonMobil (through both of its predecessors)
- Ford Motor Company
- General Motors Corporation
- Illinois Power
- Motor Vehicle Manufacturers Association
- National Association of Manufacturers
- National Coal Association
- National Mining Association
- National Rural Electric Cooperative Association
- Ohio Edison
- Phillips Petroleum
- Shell Oil
- Southern Company
- Texaco
- Union Electric Company
- United States Chamber of Commerce

== See also ==
- The Power of Big Oil

== Bibliography ==
- Banerjee, Neela; Song, Lisa; Hasemyer, David (September 16, 2015). "Exxon's Own Research Confirmed Fossil Fuels' Role in Global Warming Decades Ago". InsideClimate News. Archived from the original on October 13, 2015.
- Brill, Ken (June 20, 2001). "Your meeting with members of the Global Climate Coalition" (PDF). United States Department of State. Archived (PDF) from the original on February 23, 2016.
- Brown, Lester R. (July 25, 2000). "The Rise and Fall of the Global Climate Coalition". In Brown, Lester R.; Larsen, Janet; Fischlowitz-Roberts, Bernie (eds.). The Earth Policy Reader: Today's Decisions, Tomorrow's World. Routledge. ISBN 9781134208340. Archived from the original on February 14, 2016.
- Farley, Maggie (December 7, 1997). "Showdown at Global Warming Summit". Los Angeles Times. Archived from the original on February 13, 2016.
- Franz, Wendy E. (1998). "Science, skeptics, and non-state actors in the greenhouse" (PDF). Belfer Center for Science and International Affairs.
- Hammond, Keith (December 4, 1997). "Astroturf Troopers, How the polluters' lobby uses phony front groups to attack the Kyoto treaty". Mother Jones. Archived from the original on February 5, 2016.
- Helvarg, David (December 16, 1996). "The greenhouse spin". The Nation. Vol. 263, no. 20. pp. 21–24. Archived from the original on February 16, 2016.
- Jones, Charles A.; Levy, David L. (2007). "North American business strategies towards climate change". European Management Journal. 25 (6): 428–440. doi:10.1016/j.emj.2007.07.001.
- Lee, Jennifer 8. (May 28, 2003). "Exxon backs groups that question global warming". The New York Times. Archived from the original on February 5, 2016.
- Levy, David (November 1997). "Not to worry, say business lobbyists". Dollars & Sense.
- Levy, David L. (January 2001). "Business and climate change: Privatizing environmental regulation?". Dollars & Sense.
- Levy, David; Rothenberg, Sandra (October 1999). "Corporate strategy and climate change: heterogeneity and change in the global automobile industry". Belfer Center for Science and International Affairs – via Harvard Kennedy School.
- Lieberman, Amy; Rust, Susanne (December 31, 2015). "Big Oil braced for global warming while it fought regulations". Los Angeles Times. Archived from the original on April 1, 2021.
- Lorenzetti, Laura (September 16, 2015). "Exxon has known about climate change since the 1970s". Fortune. Archived from the original on October 15, 2015.
- May, Bob (January 27, 2005). "Under-informed, over here". The Guardian.
- McGregor, Ian (2008). Organising to Influence the Global Politics of Climate Change (PDF). Australian and New Zealand Academy of Management Conference. Archived (PDF) from the original on February 24, 2016.
- Mitchell, Alison (December 13, 1997). "G.O.P. Hopes Climate Fight Echoes Health Care Outcome". The New York Times. Archived from the original on February 17, 2016.
- Mooney, Chris (May 2005). "Some Like It Hot". Mother Jones. Archived from the original on February 24, 2016.
- Mulvey, Kathy; Shulman, Seth (July 2015). "The Climate Deception Dossiers" (PDF). Union of Concerned Scientists. Archived (PDF) from the original on January 28, 2016.
- Rahm, Dianne (2009). Climate Change Policy in the United States: The Science, the Politics and the Prospects for Change. McFarland & Company. ISBN 9780786458011.
- Revkin, Andrew C. (April 23, 2009). "Industry Ignored Its Scientists on Climate". The New York Times. Archived from the original on June 9, 2021.
- Van den Hove, Sybille; Le Menestrel, Marc; De Bettignies, Henri-Claude (2002). "The oil industry and climate change: strategies and ethical dilemmas". Climate Policy. 2 (1): 3–18. Bibcode:2002CliPo...2....3V. doi:10.3763/cpol.2002.0202. S2CID 219594585.
- Vidal, John (June 8, 2005). "Revealed: how oil giant influenced Bush". The Guardian. Archived from the original on May 22, 2020.
- Whitman, Elizabeth (October 10, 2015). "Exxon Arctic Drilling Benefitting From Global Warming: Oil Company Denied Climate Change Science While Factoring It Into Arctic Operations, Report Shows". International Business Times. Archived from the original on October 22, 2015.
