= Information Council for the Environment =

American former public relations organization

- Abbreviation: ICE
- Formation: 1991; 35 years ago
- Type: Astroturfing group
- Purpose: Climate change denial
- Key people: Fred Palmer; Patrick Michaels; Robert Balling; Sherwood B. Idso; S. Fred Singer
- Funding: National Coal Association; Western Fuels Association; Edison Electrical Institute

The Information Council for the Environment (ICE) was an American climate change denial organization created by the National Coal Association, the Western Fuels Association, and Edison Electrical Institute.

== History ==
In the 1980s, the scientific consensus on global warming had begun to form: the planet was warming as a result of humans burning fossil fuels, and this would be a problem for humanity. By the early 1990s, public awareness of the issue had grown, and the coal industry's Western Fuels Association sought to present a counterargument that increased carbon emissions would be beneficial, rather than harmful, to the environment. To do this, they created the Greening Earth Society and ICE. To maximize the impact of their campaigns, the Western Fuels Association carried out extensive market research. Indeed, the acronym ICE was chosen before the organization was named. Other potential names included: "Informed Citizens for the Environment", "Intelligent Concern for the Environment", and "Informed Choices for the Environment." Focus groups showed that American citizens trusted scientists more than politicians or activists, so the technical-sounding name "Information Council for the Environment" was selected.

In an initiative largely led by Western Fuel's CEO, Fred Palmer, ICE spent $510,000 to run test campaigns from February through August 1991. The organization had several goals that were internally documented; when its top ten were enumerated, number one was to "reposition global warming as theory (not fact)." National Coal Association president Richard L. Lawson asked members to contribute to the ICE campaign. He stated in a memo, "our industry cannot sit on the sidelines in this debate." Four of the 15 largest coal producers (ARCO Coal, Peabody Holding Company, Island Creek Coal Company, and Amax Coal Industries) donated at least $15,000 to the campaigns. Patrick Michaels, Robert Balling and Sherwood B. Idso all lent their names in 1991 to its scientific advisory panel. Its publicity plan called for placing these three scientists, along with fellow climate change denier S. Fred Singer, in broadcast appearances, op-ed pages, and newspaper interviews.

Bracy, Williams & Co., a Washington D.C.–based PR firm, did the advance publicity work for the interviews. Another company was contracted to conduct opinion polls, which identified "older, less-educated males from larger households who are not typically active information-seekers" and "younger, lower-income women" as "good targets for radio advertisements" that would "directly attack the proponents of global warming [...] through comparison of global warming to historical or mythical instances of gloom and doom."

Print and radio advertisements flooded the cities selected for the campaigns. One print advertisement prepared for the ICE campaign showed a sailing ship about to drop off the edge of a flat world into the jaws of a waiting dragon. The headline read: "Some say the earth is warming. Some also said the earth was flat." Another featured a cowering chicken under the headline "Who Told You the Earth Was Warming . . . Chicken Little?" Another ad was targeted at Minneapolis readers and asked, "If the earth is getting warmer, why is Minneapolis getting colder?" The statements made in the advertisements were false or exaggerated. For example, an officer of the American Meteorological Society noted that Minneapolis had actually warmed 1.0 to 1.5 degrees in the twentieth century. Many of the advertisements had a box in which people could write their contact details to receive more information, from which Bracy, Williams constructed a mailing list of sympathetic civilians.

The ICE campaign collapsed after internal memoranda were leaked by environmental activists to the press. An embarrassed Michaels hastily disassociated himself, citing what he called its "blatant dishonesty." Following the collapse, he, Balling, Idso, and Singer continued to express their denial about the scientific facts of global warming. They joined organizations similar to ICE and were prominent in public discussions of climate change despite their positions being widely out of sync with the rest of the scientific community. Industry representatives continued to push the narrative that carbon dioxide emissions were good, with Palmer declaring that fossil fuels were a "gift from God". He stated at a coal industry conference in 1996 that government action to inhibit global warming was the first step in a slippery slope towards socialism, and continued his lobbying and PR work with the re-launch of the Greening Earth Society in 1998.

== See also ==
- Politicization of science
