= World Climate Report =

Newsletter

World Climate Report, a newsletter edited by Patrick Michaels, was produced by the Greening Earth Society, a non-profit organization created by the Western Fuels Association.

Early editions were paper based; it was then transferred to a web-only format, having ceased publication as a physically based report with Volume 8 in 2002. It existed until 2019 in blog form at www.worldclimatereport.com, although the website itself was not updated after late 2012.

World Climate Report presented a dismissive view of anthropogenic-driven mass global climate change, or as it calls it, 'Global Warming Alarmism'. However, it did not reject other well-established and widely accepted scientific concepts such as global climate change itself or the greenhouse effect, in general attempting to engender itself as giving a well balanced and scientific view of the sources (though often at a contrary expense of its perceived adversaries: the aforementioned alleged 'Global Warming Alarmists').

WCR says of itself:

World Climate Report, a concise, hard-hitting and scientifically correct response to the global change reports which gain attention in the literature and popular press. As the nation's leading publication in this realm, World Climate Report is exhaustively researched, impeccably referenced, and always timely. This popular biweekly newsletter points out the weaknesses and outright fallacies in the science that is being touted as "proof" of disastrous warming. It's the perfect antidote against those who argue for proposed changes to the Rio Climate Treaty, such as the Kyoto Protocol, which are aimed at limiting carbon emissions from the United States ... World Climate Report has become the definitive and unimpeachable source for what nature now calls the “mainstream skeptic” point of view. .

In addition to Patrick Michaels (chief editor), the staff is listed as Robert C. Balling, Jr (contributing editor), Robert Davis (contributing editor), and Paul Knappenberger (Administrator).
