= Business for Innovative Climate and Energy Policy =

U.S. coalition of businesses

- Founded: 2008
- Type: Public policy
- Location: Boston, Massachusetts, US
- Website: www.ceres.org/bicep

Business for Innovative Climate and Energy Policy (BICEP) is a coalition of businesses coordinated by Ceres whose primary goal is to call on the U.S. government to pass broad, bi-partisan energy and climate legislation. BICEP currently has 80+ members.

== History ==
BICEP, a project of Ceres, was founded in November 2008 and is an advocacy coalition of businesses committed to working with policy makers to pass meaningful energy and climate legislation and giving consumer-facing businesses a stronger voice in the formation of progressive climate change legislation. The founding members of BICEP saw a need to form the new coalition, rather than joining other established organizations, such as the U.S. Climate Action Partnership, whose members tend to be larger emitters with different needs than many consumer companies face.

BICEP was founded on the belief that the energy and climate challenges facing the United States present vast opportunities, along with urgent risks, for U.S. businesses. A rapid transition to a 21st-century, low-carbon economy will create new jobs and stimulate economic growth while stabilizing the planet's fragile climate. BICEP's members are primarily consumer companies that are not major greenhouse gas emitters but will nevertheless be impacted by climate regulations and other climate-related impacts. BICEP members believe that climate change will impact all sectors of the economy and that various business perspectives are needed to provide a full spectrum of viewpoints for solving the climate and energy challenges facing America.

== BICEP's goal and core principles ==
BICEP's goal is to work directly with key allies in the business community and with members of Congress to promote a broad, bi-partisan consensus among policy makers to reduce US greenhouse gas emissions 80 percent below 1990 levels by 2050, with an interim goal of at least 25 percent below 1990 levels by 2020. They recognize the multiple paths to accomplishing this goal and therefore stand behind the following principles in the development of U.S. energy and climate policy:

=== Principles ===
- Promote Energy Efficiency and Renewable Energy
- Increase Investment in a Clean Energy Economy
- Support Climate Change Adaptation, Technology Transfer and Forest Preservation

=== Essential Policy Elements ===
- Establish aggressive energy efficiency policies
- Adopt a renewable energy policy
- Increase investment in clean energy technology
- Encourage transportation for a clean energy economy
- Promote an efficient energy market by adjusting fuel subsidies and pricing carbon appropriately
- Support climate change adaptation domestically and internationally
- Support developing countries in reducing carbon emissions

BICEP members believe that the recent economic crisis and the looming threat of global warming together present a profound opportunity for U.S. businesses, and that the bold steps are needed to restore the US economy are closely related to actions needed to solve the climate crisis. They believe that a rapid transition to a 21st-century low-carbon economy will create new jobs and stimulate economic growth while stabilizing the Earth's climate.

== BICEP members ==
BICEP currently consists of 80+ member companies. The four founding members are Starbucks, Nike, Timberland and Levi Strauss & Co. Since then, BICEP has added 44 more companies, including: Adobe, Annie's Homegrown, Aspen Skiing Company, Autodesk, Aveda, Ben and Jerry's, Burton Snowboards, CA Technologies, Clif Bar & Company, Dignity Health, eBay, Eileen Fisher, Etsy, Fetzer Vineyards, Gap Inc., General Mills, Hackensack Meridian Health, IKEA, Jones Lang LaSalle, KB Home, Kellogg, Limited Brands, L'Oréal, Mars, Inc., Nature's Path Foods, Nestle, New Belgium Brewing, The North Face, Outdoor Industry Association, San Francisco International Airport, Owens Corning, Patagonia, Portland Trail Blazers, Salesforce, Seventh Generation Inc., Sierra Nevada Brewing, Stonyfield Farm, Symantec Corporation, Unilever, Vail Resorts, VF Corporation, Vulcan Inc., and Worthen Industries.

== See also ==
- Climate change
- Business action on climate change
- Corporate sustainability
- Investor Network on Climate Risk
