= USCAP =

USCAP may refer to several things:

- United States and Canadian Academy of Pathology
- U.S. Climate Action Partnership
