= Dry Fork Mine =

Coal mine located in Gillette, Wyoming

Dry Fork
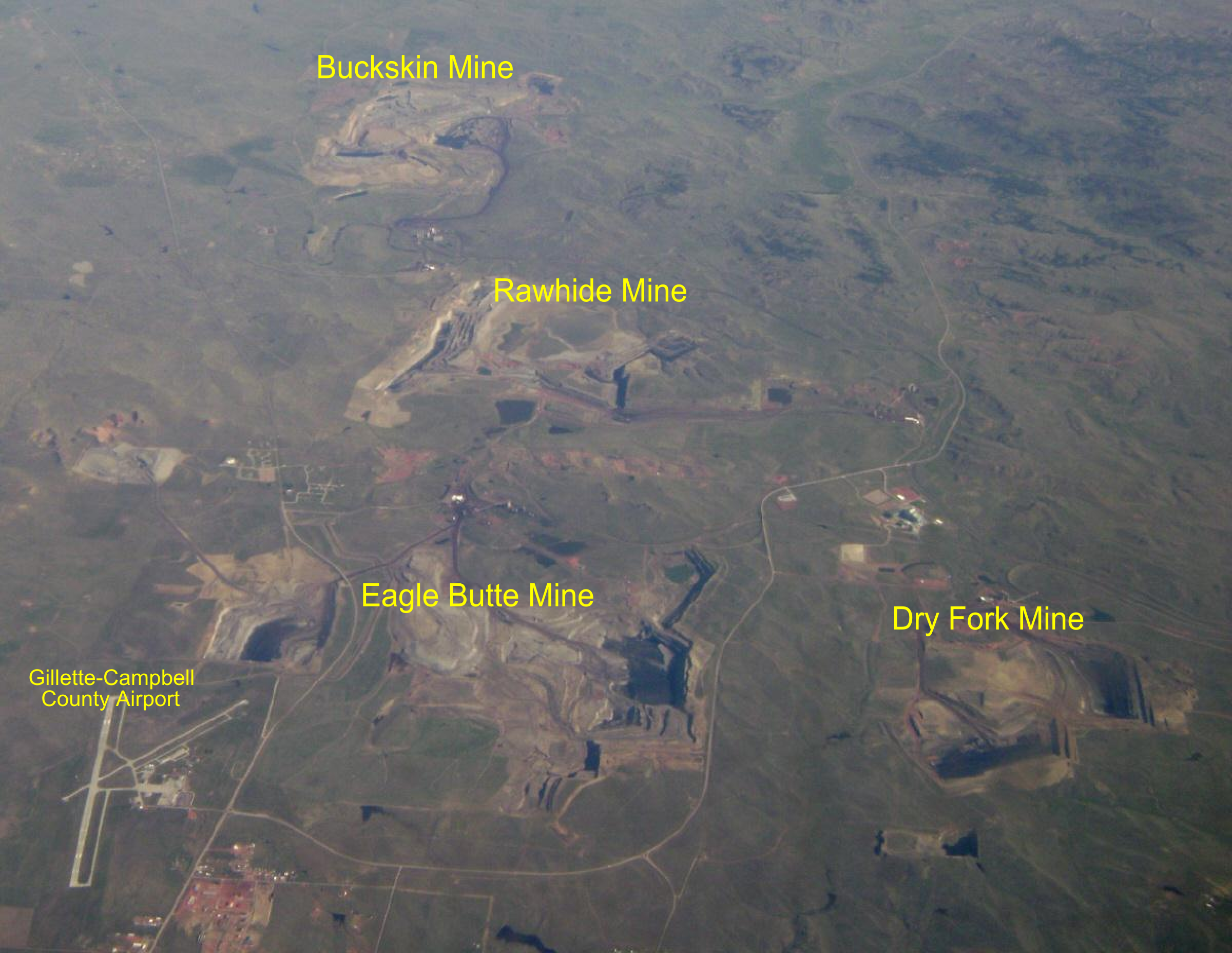
- Coal mines north and east of Gillette–Campbell County Airport, including the Dry Fork Mine

- Location in Wyoming

Location
- Location: Wyoming, USA; 44°22′59″N 105°27′19″W

Production
- Products: Coal

History
- Opened: 1990

Owner
- Company: Western Fuels Association
- Website: www.westernfuels.org
- Acquired: 1990

The Dry Fork mine is a coal mine located 8 miles north of Gillette, Wyoming in the United States in the coal-rich Powder River Basin. The mine is an open pit mine that utilizes truck and shovel mining method to mine a low-sulfur, sub-bituminous coal that is used for domestic energy generation and shipped to customers via railroad. In 2011, the mine began supplying coal to the newly constructed Dry Fork power station that was constructed adjacent to the mine. The mine is currently owned and operated by Western Fuels Association.

As of 2009, Dry Fork had reserves of 330 mm tons of sub-bituminous coal and a maximum permitted production capacity of 15mm tons per year. Typical annual production has been in 5.2mm ton range for the last several years though. In 2008, the mine produced just over 5.2 million short tons of coal, making it the 37th-largest producer of coal in the United States.

The average quality of the coal shipped from Dry Fork is 8,050-8,200 BTU/lb, 0.20-0.42% Sulfur, 3.8-5.1% Ash, and 1.50% Sodium (of the ash). Train loading operations at the mine are done with a batch weigh bin system that is coupled to a "weigh-in-motion" track scale system. Silo capacity at the mine's rail loop, which can accommodate a single unit train, is 10,800 tons.

== History ==
The Dry Fork mine shipped its first coal to members of the Western Fuels Association in 1990 and is run by Western Fuels-Wyoming an associate of Western Fuels. Since opening, Dry Fork has shipped 69.5mm tons of coal.

== Production ==
Year	Coal production	Employees
2018	6,304,022	83
2017	6,045,618	82
2016	6,141,433	82
2015	6,369,206	79
2014	5,373,973	79
2013	5,433,936	78
2012	6,006,787	77
2011	5,776,092	79
2010	5,448,073	71
2009	5,232,451	67
2008	5,261,242	71
2007	5,310,716	70
2006	5,860,998	69
2005	4,093,611	61
2004	4,533,621	61
2003	4,363,683	61
2002	4,891,403	65
2001	4,029,100	68
2000	2,268,720	34
1999	1,219,590	9
1998	1,030,718	9
1997	918,224	8
1996	2,945,662	39
1995	3,606,453	47
1994	3,836,228	51
1993	3,279,801	49
1992	3,453,340	49
1991	2,786,946	43
1990	736,641	32
1989	0	3
