= Robert Balling =

American geographer

Robert C. Balling
- Born: December 16, 1952 (age 73); Uniontown, Pennsylvania, U.S.
- Education: Wittenberg University (BA); Bowling Green State University (MA); University of Oklahoma (PhD)
- Known for: Climate change denial
- Awards: 2011 Professor of the Year Award from the Order of Omega
- Scientific career
- Fields: Geography, climatology
- Workplaces: Arizona State University
- Thesis: Regional winter climatic variations associated with atmospheric circulation change in the coterminous United States, 1939-1965 (1979)

Robert C. Balling, Jr. is an American climatologist. He is a professor of geography at Arizona State University, and the former director of its Office of Climatology. His research interests include climatology, global climate change, and geographic information systems. Balling has declared himself one of the scientists who oppose the consensus on global warming, arguing in a 2009 book that anthropogenic global warming "is indeed real, but relatively modest", and maintaining that there is a publication bias in the scientific literature.

== Education and career ==
Balling was born and raised in Uniontown, Pennsylvania, and moved to Springfield, Ohio, in 1970 to attend Wittenberg University. Balling gained bachelor's and master's degrees in geography in 1974 (Wittenberg University, BA) and 1975 (Bowling Green State University, MA), before gaining his PhD in geography from the University of Oklahoma in 1979. He was assistant professor at the University of Nebraska–Lincoln (1979–1984), before joining the Office of Climatology at Arizona State University. He gained tenure there in 1987, and served as the director of the Office of Climatology until 2004.

== Research ==
Balling has published much research pertaining to various factors that influence the Earth's climate. In 1988, Balling published a study which found that the construction of golf courses around Palm Springs, CA may have cooled the city over the preceding 15 years, in contrast to the warming effect usually associated with urban areas (also known as the urban heat island effect). Seven years later, Balling and Randall S. Cerveny, one of his ASU colleagues, published a study which found that the moon, when it is full, can cause Earth's troposphere to warm by more than 0.03 °F. However, it remained unclear why the moon might be able to do this. When interviewed by the New York Times, Balling suggested the main reason might be that infrared radiation from the Sun is reflected towards Earth by the full moon. In 1998, Balling and Cerveny published a letter to Nature which found that man-made air pollutants, especially ozone and carbon monoxide, were influencing weather patterns on the East Coast of the United States. Their study also concluded that this effect was the strongest on Saturdays, and that this was so because "...the end of the week brings worse air pollution than the beginning."

== Funding controversy ==
Balling was mentioned as a fossil fuel industry – funded scientist in Ross Gelbspan's 1997 book The Heat is On. This led the Minnesota Star Tribune to run an editorial speaking of a "disinformation campaign" by some climatologists. Balling and his colleague Patrick Michaels took a complaint against the Star Tribune to the Minnesota News Council. By a 9–4 decision the council "voted to sustain the complaint that the Star Tribune editorial unfairly characterized the scientific reputations of Patrick Michaels and Robert Balling." At the 1998 hearing, Balling "acknowledged that he had received $408,000 in research funding from the fossil fuel industry over the last decade (of which his University takes 50% for overhead)."

Between December 1998 and September 2001 Balling was listed as a "Scientific Adviser" to the Greening Earth Society, a group that was funded and controlled by the Western Fuels Association (WFA), an association of coal-burning utility companies. WFA founded the group in 1997, according to an archived version of its website, "as a vehicle for advocacy on climate change, the environmental impact of CO2, and fossil fuel use." In 2001, while it was directed by Balling, ASU's office of climatology received $49,000 from ExxonMobil.

From 1989 to 2002, Balling received more than $679,000 from fossil-fuel-industry organizations; as of 2007, he also had received more than $7 million in research funding from the National Science Foundation and the EPA. He has also come under scrutiny because he was listed as a tentative author of the Heartland Institute's NIPCC report; however, ASU's vice president of public affairs, Virgil Renzulli, pointed out that this did not imply that Balling had been receiving money from Heartland. Balling himself added that his prior involvement with the Heartland Institute's activities amounted only to appearing at a luncheon they held in 2008.

On February 24, 2015, Arizona State Representative Raúl Grijalva wrote letters to seven universities where climate change deniers (including Balling) worked, citing concerns about these scientists' conflicts of interest and non-disclosure of corporate funding. In these letters, Grijalva requested records on the funding and testimony prepared before a government body.

== Books ==
- Robert C. Balling, The Heated Debate: greenhouse predictions versus climate reality, Pacific Research Institute for Public Policy, April 1992, ISBN 0-936488-47-6
- Robert C. Balling, and Martin A. J. Williams, Interactions of Desertification & Climate, Oxford University Press, October 1995, ISBN 0-340-63217-8
- Patrick Michaels and Robert C. Balling, The Satanic Gases: clearing the air about global warming, Cato Institute, 2000 ASIN: 1882577914
- Patrick Michaels and Robert C. Balling, Climate of extremes: global warming science they don't want you to know, Cato Institute, 2009

== Views on global warming ==
Balling believes that humans are increasing the level of CO2 in Earth's atmosphere, and that the Earth should warm as a result. Balling also considers the mainstream description of climate change to be "a vastly overrated threat whose proposed solutions are worse than the problem." In particular, he has dismissed the idea that use of renewable energy could be an effective strategy for combating global warming as "absurd." In the book Climate of Extremes, Balling, along with his co-author Patrick Michaels, contend that certain phenomena usually attributed to anthropogenic global warming have actually been occurring for more than a century. The phenomena named include the loss of ice on Mount Kilimanjaro. Balling has made similar statements about current sea level rise; namely, that it has been occurring for 8,000 years and it is therefore "quite a stretch" to blame it on global warming.

=== Reaction to Balling's views on global warming ===
In the December 1995 issue of Harper's Magazine, Ross Gelbspan described Balling and other global warming deniers as "extraordinarily adept at draining the [global warming] issue of all sense of crisis." Climate of Extremes was reviewed in Foreign Affairs by Richard N. Cooper, who concluded that "Even if the authors have cherry-picked their scientific papers, this book is a useful antidote to the heavy dose of hype to which the public is regularly subjected." By contrast, The Satanic Gases, another Balling-Michaels collaboration which was published in 2000, received a scathing review from American Scientist. Reviewer John Firor argued that the book "does not fulfill" its claim (on the dust jacket) that global warming predictions are "simply wrong", that Michaels and Balling criticized the Kyoto Protocol without having read it, and that they quoted a well-known scientist out of context. After Balling wrote an article for TCS Daily harshly criticizing An Inconvenient Truth as scientifically inaccurate, his article was itself criticized as inaccurate by Judd Legum, who said that the article used "misleading scientific arguments." Legum's critique was endorsed by geochemist Eric Steig, a contributor to RealClimate, who said that "All those points are accurate," and that "Some of them could probably have been stronger; that is, Balling is even more wrong that Legum indicates."
