= Global Climate and Energy Project =

Standford's GCEP:Pioneering sustainable energy solutions for a changing world

The Global Climate and Energy Project (GCEP) at Stanford University, "seeks new solutions to one of the grand challenges of this century: supplying energy to meet the changing needs of a growing world population in a way that protects the environment."

Beginning in December 2002, GCEP is a 10-year, $225m research project aimed at developing new energy technologies. These new energy technologies include areas of interest such as renewable energy, CO_{2} capture and storage, hydrogen storage and electrocatalysis. It has the support of four major companies - ExxonMobil, General Electric, Schlumberger, and Toyota. Under the heading "Grand Challenge", it identifies a global warming-related need to reduce greenhouse gas emissions through future energy development.

== Targeted goals ==
1. Identify promising research opportunities for low-emissions, high-efficiency energy technologies.

2. Identify barriers to the larger scale application of these new technologies within the project.

3. Conduct fundamental research into technologies that will help to overcome these barriers and provide the basis for large-scale applications.

4. Share research results with a wide audience, including the science and engineering community, media, business, governments, and potential end-users.

== Research overview ==
More than 200 Stanford University faculty members are involved in the program. With students, technicians and others who are actively engaged at the tasks at hand, Stanford's Global Climate and Energy Project focuses on traditional issues like renewable energy, fossils and nuclear energy, energy storage, grid modernization and its environmental impact. There are several separate research projects being conducted but all share the same common goal, which is to develop new technologies to support the decline of greenhouse gases and carbon emissions.

== Stanford awarded projects ==
=== Nighttime radiative cooling: Harvesting the darkness of the universe ===
A device was created that generated electricity for night time use to allow heat to radiate into outer space. This project was awarded by one of Stanford's top projects because it opened up and exposed large temperature differences between earth and space. This allowed light to be released at night without any electrical inputs or battery-powered technology.

=== Electrochemical tuning of electronic structures to create highly active electrocatalysts ===
The project was created to tackle metal catalysts for a cheaper cost and separate water into oxygen and clean burning hydrogen fuels. The research study was done using lithium to enrich hydrogen production. This was done with several catalytic materials and applied physics to reach the common goal for tuning electronic structures into active electrocatalysts.

== Results of project 10-year anniversary ==
After 10 years, the Stanford Global Climate Energy Project has helped support up to 80 research programs within Stanford's internal research and have expanded it to 38 others across the world. One example of the program's success is a 2007 study of artificial photosynthesis by Caltech scientist Nathan Lewis, Harry Gray and Harry Atwater who developed Joint Center on Artificial photosynthesis. This was a development towards artificial solar fueled technology. Stanford University's president John Hennessy said "We sat back and realized that energy was going to be a really big research topic for the university...GCEP was the beginning of that process, Stanford is a place where the idea of taking on a big challenge is not only OK, but expected."

=== Awarding $9.3 million for innovative energy research ===
The GCEP was awarded a $9.3 million research project on energy funded technology to be developed over six new research based projects. Including Stanford University, four other universities are involved in the positive development of this energy project. Sally Benson, a professor for energy resources engineers at Stanford University said "These six projects are potential game changers that could help transform our global energy system in the future.”
