= U.S. Climate Action Partnership =

Cooperative group of organisations with the aim of reducing greenhouse gas emissions

The U.S. Climate Action Partnership (USCAP), formed in 2006 and launched publicly on January 22, 2007, is a co-operative group of businesses and leading environmental organizations. The group's primary purpose is to call on the U.S. government to require significant reductions in greenhouse gas emissions.

== Origins ==
In January, 2006, the Pew Center on Global Climate Change [link], General Electric, Environmental Defense Fund, and World Resources Institute formed the Climate Change Initiative to work on a joint business-NGO plan for federal climate policy with regulation of greenhouse gases. NRDC joined the group, and the Pew Center recruited companies in its Business Environmental Leadership Council (BELC) including Alcoa, BP, Caterpillar, Duke Energy, Dupont, Florida Power & Light, Pacific Gas and Electric Company, and PNM Resources. The CCI worked in secret throughout 2006, facilitated by the Meridian Institute, on the analysis and negotiation resulting in A Call for Action.

== "A Call For Action" ==
USCAP's principles and goals are summarized in their brochure "A Call For Action":

We, the members of the U.S. Climate Action

Partnership, pledge to work with the President, the Congress, and all other stakeholders to enact an environmentally effective, economically sustainable, and fair climate change program consistent with our

principles at the earliest practicable date.

== Targets ==
The USCAP Blueprint calls for the United States to act quickly to establish a mandatory, national economy-wide climate protection program that includes emission reduction targets for total U.S. emissions and for capped sectors that are:

- 97%–102% of 2005 levels by 2012
- 80%-86% of 2005 levels by 2020
- 58% of 2005 levels by 2030
- 20% of 2005 levels by 2050.

These targets do not comply with the IPCC proposed target reductions of 25 to 40% of 1990 levels by 2020 and 80 to 95% of 1990 levels by 2050 for Annex 1 (developed) countries under Scenario A to limit Greenhouse gases to 450ppm

== USCAP members ==
This list is complete as of July 3, 2007

The 14 founding members of USCAP are:

- Alcoa, BP America, Caterpillar Inc, Duke Energy, DuPont
- Environmental Defense, FPL Group, General Electric, Lehman Brothers
- Natural Resources Defense Council, Pew Center on Global Climate Change
- PG&E Corporation, PNM Resources, and World Resources Institute

In April 2007 oil giant ConocoPhillips and insurer AIG joined USCAP.

The following groups and companies joined in June 2007:

- American International Group (AIG), Alcan, Boston Scientific, ConocoPhillips
- John Deere, Dow Chemical Company, General Motors
- Johnson & Johnson, Marsh, PepsiCo, Shell
- Siemens, The Nature Conservancy, National Wildlife Federation

In July 2007, two major U.S. automakers joined:

Chrysler, Ford

=== Members leaving ===
In February 2010

- BP America,
- Caterpillar
- ConocoPhillips and
- John Deere

all left the lobbyist collaboration and are not members anymore.

== Organizational structure ==
Journalist Timothy P. Carney, writing for the conservative think tank Capital Research Center, says that USCAP has no in-house staff. He says that, like other lobbying coalitions, it manages its affairs through outside organizations to function and coordinate the activities of its members. He further asserts that USCAP contracts with the Meridian Institute, Lighthouse Consulting, and government relations firm Powell Tate Weber Shandwick to carry out its day-to-day operations.

== Controversy ==
Questions have been raised about the same companies sponsoring both the partnership and lobbying groups that oppose its goals.

Many of the members of USCAP were previously involved with the Global Climate Coalition, whose intention was to block or minimize the effectiveness of the Intergovernmental Panel on Climate Change's demands for GHG curbing legislation. After ceasing official operation in 1997 GCC was victorious in having pressured the US into refusing to ratify the Kyoto Protocols.

Although many of these corporations have now become interested in halting climate change by 2050 through USCAP, both Yvo de Boer, UN Climate Chief and the EU have heavily criticized this long term plan for reductions as offering no short or mid-term solutions to the immediate problems of climate change.

According to Reuters, Robert Murray, chairman and chief executive of Murray Energy Corp., branded more than 20 major corporations that make up the U.S. Climate Action Partnership (USCAP) "un-American" for allying with environmental groups he calls "enemies of coal."

== Former members ==
On February 17, 2010 Five of the member companies withdrew from the organization The three companies ConocoPhillips, BP and Caterpillar said that "USCAP has served its purpose and that they prefer to pursue their interests independently" The other two were Xerox and insurance broker Marsh who were listed as members in January 2009 Ford Motor Company announced their withdrawal from the partnership on January 23, 2012.

== See also ==
- Global warming
- Effects of global warming
- Business action on climate change
- Individual and political action on climate change
