= Ross Gelbspan =

American journalist and editor (1939–2024)

Ross Gelbspan (June 1, 1939 – January 27, 2024) was an American journalist and editor. He was a reporter and editor for 31 years at The Philadelphia Bulletin, The Washington Post, the Village Voice, and The Boston Globe. At the Globe, he conceived, directed, and edited a series of articles that won a Pulitzer Prize in 1984. He covered the first UN Conference on the Environment in Stockholm in 1972 and co-authored a four-part front page series on the global environment on the occasion of the Rio Conference for the Boston Globe in 1992.

Following his retirement from daily journalism, he published The Heat Is On in 1997. The book received national attention when then-President Clinton told the press he was reading it. The book received positive reviews in The New York Times, Los Angeles Times, Boston Globe, the Minneapolis StarTribune, the journal Nature, and elsewhere. It was excerpted in The Washington Post, the San Jose Mercury News, and several other newspapers. In 2004, he published a second book, Boiling Point, which received the lead review in the Sunday New York Times Book Review. The review was written by Al Gore.

Gelbspan has spoken extensively on the climate crisis, including appearances at the World Economic Forum, Renaissance Weekend, Oxford University, and numerous colleges, universities, and civic and environmental organizations. He appeared on a number of programs, including “Nightline,” “All Things Considered”, and “Talk of the Nation”, "Frontline", and "ABC World News Tonight". His articles on the climate issue have appeared in Harpers, The Atlantic, The Nation, The American Prospect, and a number of other newspapers and magazines.

== Career ==
In 1971, he spent a month in the Soviet Union, where he was detained by the KGB after interviewing Soviet dissidents and human rights advocates. His four-part series on the Soviet underground, written for The Village Voice, was reprinted in the Congressional Record. In 1974, he edited a book for Scripps-Howard on the Congressional Watergate Committee hearings.

In 1979, the Boston Globe hired Gelbspan as a senior editor. In his capacity as special projects editor, he conceived, directed, and edited a series of articles on job discrimination against African-Americans in Boston-area corporations, universities, unions, newspapers, and state and city government. The series won a Pulitzer Prize in 1984.

In 1991, he published an investigative book about FBI abuses during the 1980s. The book exposed the domestic aspect of the Iran-Contra scandal, documented a secret relationship between the FBI and the National Guard of El Salvador, and detailed a campaign of surveillance, harassment, and break-ins that led to the entry of the names of 100,000 political and religious activists in the FBI terrorism files. That same year, he wrote a series of articles that contributed to the closing of an aging, unsafe nuclear power plant in Western Massachusetts.

=== The Heat Is On ===
Bill McKibben wrote, "Until you've read this book, you're ill-equipped to think about the planet's future." The New York Times Book Review said "No other reporter has told the story as comprehensively or explored its implications for human welfare as searchingly as Gelbspan" (quoted on cover of paperback edition of The Heat Is On).

A major theme of The Heat Is On is the treatment of the climate change issue in the U.S. Congress during the 1990s. Chapter 3 is entitled "A Congressional Book Burning". Gelbspan recounts numerous House and Senate hearings where Republican representatives and Senators focused on and endorsed the views of scientists who oppose the mainstream scientific assessment of global warming such as Patrick Michaels, S. Fred Singer, and Richard Lindzen.

== Personal life ==
Gelbspan was born in Chicago in 1939, received his B.A. from Kenyon College in 1960, and completed a year of post-graduate study at the Johns Hopkins School of Advanced International Studies in Washington, D.C.

In 1972, while covering the first UN Conference on the Environment in Stockholm, he met his wife Anne Charlotte Brostrom. Prior to her retirement, she spent 25 years as a nonprofit developer, creating affordable housing for homeless families, primarily in inner city neighborhoods in Boston, New Bedford, and Lawrence, Massachusetts.

Their older daughter, Thea, was graduated from Macalester College in 1997. She was coordinator of Latin America programs for Oxfam America, as well as director of social movements for the International Network for Economic, Social, and Cultural Rights. Their younger daughter, Joby, was a coordinator and member of the board of directors of Corporate Accountability International as well as CFO of The American Prospect. A graduate of The New School, she received an MBA in finance and accounting from Northeastern University.

Gelbspan died from complications of chronic obstructive pulmonary disease in Boston, Massachusetts, on January 27, 2024, at the age of 84.

== Publications ==
- Boiling Point: How Politicians, Big Oil and Coal, Journalists and Activists Are Fueling the Climate Crisis—And What We Can Do to Avert Disaster, Basic Books, (August 1, 2004) ISBN 0-465-02761-X
- The Heat Is On: The Climate Crisis, the Cover-Up, the Prescription, Perseus Books Group; Updated edition (September 1, 1998) ISBN 0-7382-0025-5
- The Washington Post, March 19, 1995, "Should We Fear a Global Plague? Yes – Disease Is the Deadliest Threat of Rising Temperatures"
- Break-Ins, Death Threats and the FBI: The Covert War Against the Central America Movement, South End Press 1991

== See also ==
- Climate change policy of the United States
