= Robert E. Davis (climatologist) =

American climatologist

Robert E. Davis is a Professor of Climatology at the University of Virginia's Department of Environmental Sciences.

Davis received his Ph.D. in 1988 from the University of Delaware. His research contributions include the development of a system for measuring the power of Nor'easters. In his studies of global warming, he has suggested that it may manifest more by milder winters than by hotter summers, and predicted that its effects on human population will not be severe.
