= Western Fuels Association =

Consortium of coal suppliers and coal-fired utilities

The Western Fuels Association is a consortium of coal suppliers and coal-fired utilities based in Westminster, Colorado. Western Fuels Association supplies coal and transportation services to consumer-owned electric utilities in the Great Plains, Rocky Mountain and Southwest regions.

== Mining operations ==
In 2011 Western Fuels Association supplied approximately 19.4 million tons of coal to its members through its three mining operations; the Dry Fork Mine located in Gillette, Wyoming, The Colowyo Mine in Northwest Colorado, and the New Horizons Mine located in Nucla, Colorado.

== Advocacy ==
Western Fuels Association uses collective advocacy to represent industry interests including membership in Western Coal Traffic League, National Coal Transportation Association, CURE and the National Mining Association. In May 1994 Richard Lindzen, Patrick Michaels, and Robert Balling served as expert witnesses on behalf of Western Fuels Association in St. Paul, Minnesota to determine the environmental cost of coal burning by state power plants.

Balling was mentioned as a fossil fuel industry – funded scientist in Ross Gelbspan's 1997 book The Heat is On. This led the Minnesota Star Tribune to run an editorial speaking of a "disinformation campaign" by some climatologists. Balling and his colleague Patrick Michaels took a complaint against the Star Tribune to the Minnesota News Council. By a 9–4 decision the council "voted to sustain the complaint that the Star Tribune editorial unfairly characterized the scientific reputations of Patrick Michaels and Robert Balling." At the 1998 hearing, Balling "acknowledged that he had received $408,000 in research funding from the fossil fuel industry over the last decade (of which his University takes 50% for overhead)."

Between December 1998 and September 2001 Balling was listed as a "Scientific Adviser" to the Greening Earth Society, a group that was funded and controlled by the Western Fuels Association (WFA), an association of coal-burning utility companies. WFA founded the group in 1997, according to an archived version of its website, "as a vehicle for advocacy on climate change, the environmental impact of CO_{2}, and fossil fuel use."

== Climate change denial ==
The Western Fuels Association has played a key role in advancing and spreading climate change denial. Together with corporations like ExxonMobil it has engaged in funding contrarian scientists, conservative think tanks and various front groups that were promoting climate change denial. It has been a member or founder of several advocacy groups and coalitions, among them the Information Council on the Environment and the Greening Earth Society. While the ICE was created to develop a national communication and PR campaign designed to undermine climate science and shift climate and energy policies the Greeing Earth Society had the aim to promote the notion that fossil fuels enable economic wealth and that more CO_{2} in the atmosphere would be beneficial for planet Earth.

While the 2005 annual report of the Western Fuels Association refers only to 'environmental and regulatory uncertainty', but they have been more outspoken in past annual reports. They have established groups such as the Greening Earth Society which promote various forms of climate change denial and have funded individual deniers, such as Patrick Michaels, Craig D. Idso and Sherwood Idso. Groups established by industry bodies like the Western Fuels Association have been criticized as Astroturf organizations, since they appear superficially to be grassroots initiatives.

=== Greening Earth Society and Patrick Michaels' World Climate Report ===
The Greening Earth Society, now defunct, was a public relations organization which promoted the idea that there is considerable scientific doubt about the effects of climate change and increased levels of carbon dioxide. The Society published the World Climate Report, a newsletter edited by Patrick Michaels of the Cato Institute.

It was a non-profit organization created by the Western Fuels Association, with which it shared an office and many staff members. It has been called a "front group created by the coal industry" and an "industry front". Fred Palmer, a Society staffer, is a registered lobbyist for Peabody Energy, a coal company.

Although the Greening Earth Society generally denies the true impact of climate change, it acknowledged some degree of global warming as real: "Fact #1. The rate of global warming during the past several decades has been about 0.18°C per decade". Note that the actual increase in the global surface temperature during the 100 years ending in 2005 was 0.74 ± 0.18 °C.
