= Greening Earth Society =

The Greening Earth Society, now defunct, was a public relations organization created by the Western Fuels Association. It advocated the view that increased greenhouse gases, could potentially promote plant growth, enhancing agricultural productivity. The Society published the World Climate Report, a newsletter edited by Patrick Michaels of the Cato Institute.

== Foundation by the Western Fuels Association ==
It was a non-profit organization created by the Western Fuels Association, with which it shared an office and many staff members. It has been called a "front group created by the coal industry" and an "industry front". Fred Palmer, a Society staffer, is a registered lobbyist for Peabody Energy, a coal company.

== Controversies ==
The organization was criticized for denying the effects of climate change and the impacts of increased levels of carbon dioxide.

Although the Greening Earth Society generally rejected the science of climate change, it acknowledged some degree of global warming as real: "Fact #1. The rate of global warming during the past several decades has been about 0.18°C per decade". Note that the actual increase in the global surface temperature during the 100 years ending in 2005 was 0.74 ± 0.18 °C.
