= Soon and Baliunas controversy =

Climate change dispute

The Soon and Baliunas controversy involved the publication in 2003 of a review study titled Proxy climatic and environmental changes of the past 1000 years, written by aerospace engineer Willie Soon and astronomer Sallie Baliunas and published in the journal Climate Research. In the review, the authors expressed disagreement with the hockey stick graph and argued that historical temperature changes were related to solar variation rather than greenhouse gas emissions as was the position of the Intergovernmental Panel on Climate Change and other researchers. The publication was quickly taken up by the George W. Bush administration as a basis for amending the first Environmental Protection Agency's Report on the Environment.

The paper was strongly criticized by numerous scientists for its methodology and for its misuse of data from previously published studies, which prompted concerns about the peer review process of the paper. The controversy resulted in the resignation of half of the editors of the journal and in the admission by its publisher, Otto Kinne, that the paper should not have been published as it was. The article and responses to it featured in further global warming controversy, including questions about funding of the paper.

== Background ==
=== IPCC and the Kyoto protocol ===
By the late 1980s, scientific findings indicated that greenhouse gases including CO_{2} emissions were leading to global warming. There was increasing public and political interest, and in 1987 the World Meteorological Organization pressed for an international scientific panel to assess the topic. The United States Reagan administration, worried about political influence of scientists, successfully lobbied for the 1988 formation of the Intergovernmental Panel on Climate Change to provide reports subject to detailed approval by government delegates. The IPCC First Assessment Report included a "schematic diagram" of global temperature variations over the last thousand years which has been traced to a graph based loosely on Hubert Lamb's 1965 paper. The IPCC Second Assessment Report (SAR) of 1996 featured a graph of an early northern hemisphere reconstruction by Raymond S. Bradley and Phil Jones, and noted the 1994 reconstruction by Hughes and Henry F. Diaz questioning how widespread the Medieval Warm Period had been at any one time. Efforts to reduce CO_{2} emissions were resisted by industrial interests, and political pressures increased as the international Kyoto Protocol was opposed by lobbyists such as the American Petroleum Institute who sought climatologists to dissent and undermine its scientific credibility.

In 1998, Mann, Bradley and Hughes published a multiproxy study (MBH98) which used a new statistical approach to find patterns of climate change in both time and global distribution, over the past six centuries In 1999 they extended their approach to 1,000 years in a study (MBH99) summarised in a graph which showed relatively little change until a sharp rise in the 20th century, earning it the nickname of the hockey stick graph. In 2001 the IPCC Third Assessment Report (TAR) included a version of this graph which was frequently featured in literature publicising the findings of the IPCC report that the 1990s were likely to have been the warmest decade, and 1998 the warmest year, of the past millennium in the Northern Hemisphere.

=== Soon and Baliunas ===
After the publicity the MBH99 study had been given by the IPCC Third Assessment Report (TAR), the "hockey stick controversy" developed in which the graph was targeted by those opposing ratification of the Kyoto Protocol on global warming, including Willie Soon and Sallie Baliunas. Both were astrophysicists at the Harvard-Smithsonian Center for Astrophysics: Soon had for a long time said that climate change was primarily due to solar variation, while Baliunas had previously been noted for disputing that man-made chemicals (halocarbon refrigerants such as CFCs) were causing ozone depletion. They prepared a literature review which used data from previous papers to argue that the Medieval Warm Period had been warmer than the 20th century, and that recent warming was not unusual. They sent their paper to one of the editors of Climate Research, Chris de Freitas, an opponent of action to curb carbon dioxide emissions who has been characterized by Fred Pearce as a "climate contrarian". Unusually for a peer reviewed journal, Climate Research at the time did not have one editor in chief that would distribute submitted papers amongst its editors, leaving its authors free to "shop around" for one that would be friendly to their views.

== Publication ==
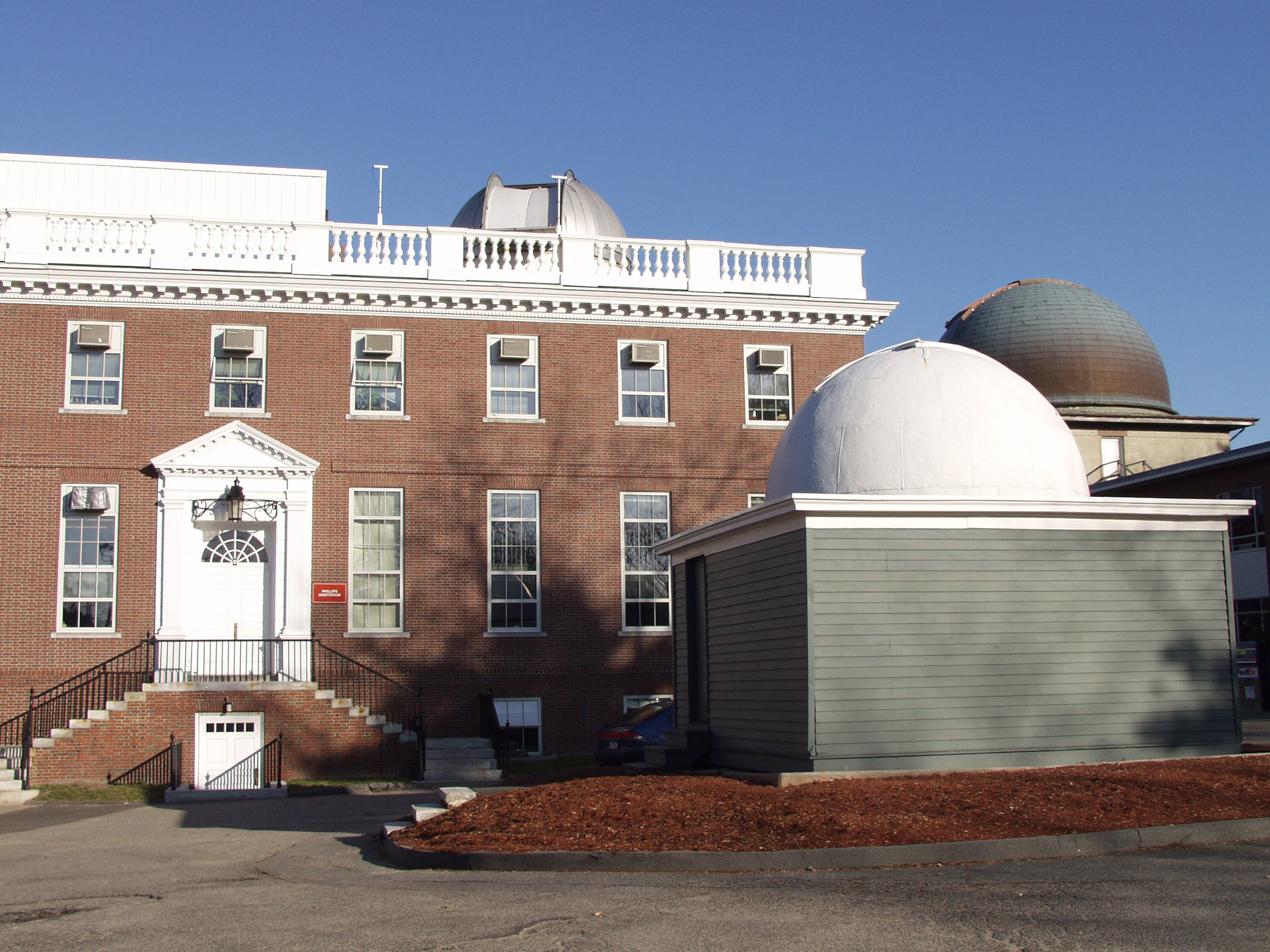
Center for Astrophysics. Harvard & Smithsonian

Chris de Freitas, as an editor at Climate Research, accepted the paper written by Soon and Baliunas and it was published in the small refereed journal on 31 January 2003 under the title Proxy climatic and environmental changes of the past 1000 years. The article reviewed 240 previously published papers and tried to find evidence for temperature anomalies in the last thousand years such as the Medieval warm period (MWP) and the Little Ice Age (LIA). The authors pointed out their disagreement with the Mann, Bradley, and Hughes hockey stick studies; "Our results suggest a different interpretation of the multiproxy climates compared to recent conclusions of Mann et al. (1998, 1999, 2000)." Their abstract concluded that "Across the world, many records reveal that the 20th century is probably not the warmest or a uniquely extreme climatic period of the last millennium". The paper acknowledged funding support from the American Petroleum Institute, the Air Force Office of Scientific Research and NASA, while stating that the views were those of the authors and were independent of the sponsoring agencies.

In the Spring of 2003, Soon and Baliunas, with three additional co-authors, published a longer version of the paper in Energy and Environment. The three additional co-authors were Craig Idso, Sherwood Idso, and David Legates. A press release dated 31 March 2003 headed "20th Century Climate Not So Hot" announced the paper with a statement lacking the caveats of the original paper; "Soon and his colleagues concluded that the 20th century is neither the warmest century over the last 1000 years, nor is it the most extreme."

In the paper, Soon, Baliunas, and their co-authors investigated the correlation between solar variation and temperatures of the Earth's atmosphere. When there are more sunspots, the total solar output increases, and when there are fewer sunspots, it decreases. Soon and Baliunas attributed the Medieval warm period to such an increase in solar output, and believe that decreases in solar output led to the Little Ice Age, a period of cooling lasting until the mid-19th Century. In a statement to The Chronicle of Higher Education, Soon said that, "When you compare the 20th century to the previous nine centuries, you do not see the change in the 20th century as anything unusual or unprecedented."

Rather than showing quantitative data, they primarily categorized research by others into those supporting, and those not supporting, the MWP and the LIA as defined by themselves. Soon said "I was stating outright that I'm not able to give too many quantitative details, especially in terms of aggregating all the results". They used a very loose definition of climate anomaly, including any period of 50 years or more that was wet, dry, warm or cold. Though "mindful" that the MWP and LIA are both defined by temperature, "we emphasize that great bias would result if those thermal anomalies were to be dissociated" from climatic conditions such as wetness and dryness, but wetness and dryness were undefined and only "referred to the standard usage in English." Their selection of a 50-year plus period excluded recent warming, which had occurred in two periods of 30 years in the 20th century, with the greatest warming in the late 20th century.

== Responses from other scientists, political intervention ==
Initially, the scientists whose work was being disputed by Soon and Baliunas felt it was one of a series of sceptical papers that, in Mann's words, "couldn't get published in a reputable journal". In March he wrote to Phil Jones that "I believed our only choice was to ignore this paper. They've already achieved what they wanted, the claim of a peer-reviewed paper. There is nothing we can do about that now, but the last thing we want is to bring attention to the paper." Jones replied "I think the sceptics will use this paper to their own ends and it will set paleo back a number of years if it goes unchallenged. I will be emailing the journal to tell them I'm having nothing more to do with it until they rid themselves of this troublesome editor", referring to de Freitas. At the time the second Soon et al. paper was publicised, Mann emailed Fred Pearce to say that it "was absurd, almost laughable (if it wasn't, as is transparently evident, being used as a policy–and politics–driven publicity stunt to support the dubious positions on climate change of some prominent American politicians)", and added that the paper made no attempt to find if the past warm temperatures it reported were contemporaneous or merely one-off scattered events.

The Bush administration was involved in editing the first Environmental Protection Agency Report on the Environment prior to the draft being made public. The administration's Council on Environmental Quality chief of staff Philip Cooney deleted all references to surface temperature reconstructions showing world temperatures rising over the last 1,000 years, and on 21 April 2003 sent a memo to Kevin O'Donovan in the Office of the Vice President stating "The recent paper of Soon-Baliunas contradicts a dogmatic view held by many in the climate science community that the past century was the warmest in the past millennium and signals human induced "global warming". ... We plan to begin to refer to this study in Administration communications on the science of global climate change; in fact, CEQ just inserted a reference to it in the final draft chapter on global climate change contained in EPA's first "State of the Environment" report. ... With both the National Academy and IPCC (Intergovernmental Panel on Climate Change) holding that the 20th Century is the warmest of the past thousand years (see below), this recent study begins to provide a counterbalance on the point to those two authorities. It represents an opening to potentially invigorate debate on the actual climate history of the past 1000 years and whether that history reinforces or detracts from our level of confidence regarding the potential human influence on global climate change."

By May the journal's editors Hans von Storch and Clare Goodess were receiving numerous complaints and critiques of the paper from other scientists, to such an extent that they raised the issues with de Freitas and the journal's publisher Otto Kinne. In reply, de Freitas said they were "a mix of a witch-hunt and the Spanish Inquisition".

Other scientists also criticized the study's methods and argued that the authors had misrepresented or misinterpreted their data. Some of those whose work was referenced by Soon and Baliunas were particularly critical. Tim Barnett of the Scripps Institution of Oceanography commented that "the fact that [the paper] has received any attention at all is a result, again in my view, of its utility to those groups who want the global warming issue to just go away". Malcolm K. Hughes of the University of Arizona, whose work on dendrochronology was discussed in the paper, said the paper was "so fundamentally misconceived and contains so many egregious errors that it would take weeks to list and explain them all." Peter Stott, a climatologist at the Hadley Centre for Climate Prediction and Research, said "Their analysis doesn't consider whether the warm/cold periods occurred at the same time". The paper would count warm or wet conditions in one region from 800 to 850 and dry conditions in a separate region from 1200 to 1250 as both demonstrating the Medieval Warm period. He noted that regional periods of warmth or cooling do not always occur at the same time as the global average warms or cools.

The media requested opinions from climate scientists and paleoclimatologists familiar with the issues underlying the Soon and Baliunas papers, and to help with information Mann and Michael Oppenheimer drafted and circulated privately a memorandum providing detailed guidance on the topic. They stated "Nothing in the paper undermines in any way the conclusion of earlier studies that the average temperature of the late twentieth century in the Northern Hemisphere was anomalous against the background of the past millennium". Colleagues receiving these requests from the media included Tom Wigley, Philip Jones and Raymond S. Bradley.

The memorandum developed into a more general position paper jointly authored by 13 climate scientists, which was published on 8 July 2003 in the journal Eos as an article "On Past Temperatures and Anomalous Late-20th Century Warmth". Most of the paper's authors had been cited in the Soon and Baliunas 2003 paper (SB03). The Eos paper made three key points: the SB03 and Soon et al. papers had misused precipitation and drought proxies without assessing their sensitivity to temperature, they had taken regional temperature changes as global changes without any attempt to show that they had occurred at the same time across the world, and they had taken as their base period for comparison mean temperatures over the whole of the 20th century, reconstructing past temperatures from proxy evidence not capable of resolving decadal trends, thus failing to show whether or not late 20th century warming was anomalous. The IPCC TAR had concluded that late 20th century Northern Hemisphere warmth was likely to have exceeded warmth of any time in the past 1,000 years on the basis of studies that compared temperatures for recent decades with reconstructions of earlier periods while allowing for uncertainties in the reconstructions. Soon, Baliunas and Legates published a response to this paper in the same journal.

== Response of journal editors ==
On 20 June 2003 the publisher of Climate Research, Otto Kinne, agreed to ask de Freitas for copies of the reviewer's evaluations: after studying the response, he advised the editors of his "Conclusions: 1) The reviewers consulted (4 for each ms) by the editor presented detailed, critical and helpful evaluations. 2) The editor properly analyzed the evaluations and requested appropriate revisions. 3) The authors revised their manuscripts accordingly. Summary: Chris de Freitas has done a good and correct job as editor."

The journal had 10 editors, who at that time each independently received and accepted manuscripts from authors. One of the editors, Clare Goodess, recalled that many of them were "somewhat confused and still very concerned about what had happened". The paper "had apparently gone to four reviewers none of whom had recommended rejection", and "The review process had apparently been correct, but a fundamentally flawed paper had been published." She and fellow editor Hans von Storch knew of three earlier papers edited by de Freitas where concerns had been raised about the review process.

To meet the concerns, Kinne proposed to adopt the more common system where instead of editors acting fully independently, an editor in chief would have overall responsibility, and that Hans von Storch would be upgraded from editor to editor in chief as of 1 August 2003. At first von Storch thought the objections to the Soon and Balunas paper should be presented in a comment which they could consider for publication, but when he saw a preprint of the Eos rebuttal of the paper he decided that "We should say that we have a problem here, that the manuscript was flawed, that the manuscript should not have been published in this way. The problem is that the conclusions are not supported by the evidence presented in the paper."

On 28 July von Storch drafted an editorial stating that "the review process of CR failed to confront the authors with necessary and legitimate methodological questions which should have been addressed in the finally printed paper", and proposing a new system in which all new papers were to be sent to the editor in chief rather than directly to individual editors as previously. While Kinne agreed that the Soon and Baliunas paper should not have been published as it was, he did not accept von Storch's proposal and wanted prior agreement from all the other editors before von Storch's editorial was published. When von Storch found that some of the other editors thought the Soon and Baliunas paper was acceptable, he "concluded that we have different standards", and suspected that "some of the skeptics had identified Climate Research as a journal where some editors were not as rigorous in the review process as is otherwise common.". He felt that "editors used different scales for judging the validity of an article. Some editors considered the problem of the Soon & Baliunas paper as merely a problem of 'opinion', while it was really a problem of severe methodological flaws. Thus, I decided that I had to disconnect from that journal, which I had served proudly for about 10 years."

Hans von Storch resigned on the same day, 28 July, and condemned the journal's review process in his resignation letter: "The review process had utterly failed; important questions have not been asked ... the methodological basis for such a conclusion (that the 20th century is probably not the warmest nor a uniquely extreme climate period of the last millennium) was simply not given." Clare Goodess also resigned later that day.

== Senate hearing ==
When the McCain-Lieberman bill proposing restrictions on greenhouse gases was being debated in the Senate on 28 July 2003, Republican Oklahoma Senator James M. Inhofe made a two-hour speech in opposition. He cited a study by the Center for Energy and Economic Development and the Soon and Baliunas paper in supporting his conclusion: "With all of the hysteria, all of the fear, all of the phony science, could it be that man-made global warming is the greatest hoax ever perpetrated on the American people? It sure sounds like it."

Inhofe convened a hearing of the United States Senate Committee on Environment and Public Works held on 29 July 2003, examining work by the small group of researchers saying there was no evidence of significant human-caused global warming. Three scientists were invited, Mann giving testimony supporting the consensus position, opposed by long term global warming deniers Willie Soon and David Legates. The Soon and Baliunas paper was discussed. Senator Jim Jeffords read out an email dated 28 July. In it, von Storch announced his resignation, and stated "that the review of the Soon et al. paper failed to detect significant methodological flaws in the paper. The critique published in the Eos journal by Mann et al. is valid." In reply, Mann testified about the Soon et al. paper, "I believe it is the mainstream view of just about every scientist in my field that I have talked to that there is little that is valid in that paper. They got just about everything wrong." He later recalled that he "left that meeting having demonstrated what the mainstream views on climate science are."

== Subsequent resignations ==
In a Climate Research editorial pre-published on 5 August 2003, its publisher Otto Kinne expressed regrets about the resignations of von Storch, Goodess, and a third editor, Mitsuru Ando. Kinne described the main conclusions of the Soon and Baliunas paper; that the late 20th century was probably not the warmest period nor uniquely extreme in the last 2,000 years, and most of the proxy records had warmer anomalies at earlier times. He wrote "While these statements may be true, the critics point out that they cannot be concluded convincingly from the evidence provided in the paper. CR should have requested appropriate revisions of the manuscript prior to publication." Kinne told the New York Times that "I have not stood behind the paper by Soon and Baliunas. Indeed: the reviewers failed to detect methodological flaws."

On 19 August 2003, Tom Wigley wrote to a colleague that "I have had papers that I refereed (and soundly rejected), under De Freitas's editorship, appear later in the journal — without me seeing any response from the authors. As I have said before to others, his strategy is first to use mainly referees that are in the anti-greenhouse community, and second, if a paper is rejected, to ignore that review and seek another more 'sympathic' reviewer. In the second case he can then (with enough reviews) claim that the honest review was an outlier." Wigley supported the suggestion of an ethics committee, which he would be willing to serve on. Until then, he urged others to "dissociate themselves from Climate Research". The editors who had not resigned appeared to him to be mostly "a rogues' gallery of skeptics", and he thought any reputable scientists still listed as editors should resign.

By this time four editors had left the journal: von Storch, Clare Goodess, Mitsuru Ando and Shardul Argawala. In mid September Andrew Comrie also withdrew, so five editors had resigned; half of the journal's editorial board. The five remaining editors included de Freitas.

== Later investigations ==
In September 2003 Soon told The Chronicle of Higher Education that the critics had mischaracterized the research in the paper. He said that he had used precipitation data because too many scientists had concentrated on temperature records which, in Soon's opinion, are not the only measures of climate. He added that "Some of the proxy information doesn't contain directly the temperature information, but it fits the general description of the medieval warm climatic anomaly. This is a first-order study to try to collect as much data as possible and try not to make the pretension that we know how to separate the information in the proxy."

In 2006, Osborn and Briffa published a paper on "The Spatial Extent of 20th-Century Warmth in the Context of the Past 1200 Years", and concluded that "comparison with instrumental temperatures shows the spatial extent of recent warmth to be of greater significance than that during the medieval period." They reexamined the questions raised in the Baliunas and Soon study, but used different statistical methodology, restricted themselves to records that were validated as temperature proxies, and considered the timing of temperature anomalies in different regions to examine whether they had happened at the same time, or were from different periods reflecting local rather than global changes. They found that by far the most widespread warming had occurred after the mid 20th century.

== Funding controversy ==
Questions have also been raised about funding for the paper. Soon and Baliunas "was in part underwritten by $53,000 from the American Petroleum Institute, the voice of the oil industry".

Also, the additional sources of funding mentioned in the papers were apparently unrelated to the research presented in Soon and Baliunas 2003 and in Soon et al. 2003: both the Air Force Office of Scientific Research and NASA stated that they had provided funds for work on solar variability, not for work related to proxy climate records as discussed in the papers, while the National Oceanic and Atmospheric Administration said it had not provided funds for the research. Air Force Office of Scientific Research, Grant AF49620-02-1-0194, deals with Theory and Observation of Stellar Magnetic Activity, and NASA grant NAG5-7635 studies variability of stars. When questioned during the 29 July 2003 Senate hearing, Soon said that the NOAA grant for Soon et al. was awarded to David Legates, and the papers, showing research into detailed patterns of local and regional climate variability, were directly relevant to his main goal of research on physical mechanisms of the sun-climate relationship. When asked if he had been "hired by or employed by or received grants from organizations that have taken advocacy positions with respect to the Kyoto Protocol, the U.N. Framework Convention on Climate Change, or legislation before the U.S. Congress that would affect greenhouse gas emissions", he responded "I have not knowingly been hired by, nor employed by, nor received grants from any such organizations described in this question."

Connections between the paper's authors and oil industry groups have been well documented. Soon and Baliunas were at the time paid consultants of the George C. Marshall Institute. Soon has also received multiple grants from the American Petroleum Institute between 2001 and 2007 totalled $274,000, and grants from ExxonMobil totalled $335,000 between 2005 and 2010. Other contributors to Soon's research career include the Charles G. Koch Foundation, which gave Soon two grants totaling $175,000 in 2005/6 and again in 2010, and coal and oil industry sources such as Mobil Foundation, the Texaco Foundation and the Electric Power Research Institute. Soon has stated that he has "never been motivated by financial reward in any of my scientific research."

Soon's co-authors Craig D. Idso and Sherwood B. Idso have also received industry funding. They have been linked to Western coal interests, and the ExxonMobil Foundation provided a grant of $15,000 to their Center for the Study of Carbon Dioxide and Global Change in 2000.

== Climatic Research Unit emails ==
In November 2009, emails and documents which had been hacked from a server belonging to the University of East Anglia were distributed on the internet. Many of the emails included communication between climatologists in East Anglia's Climatic Research Unit (CRU) and other scientists, including Michael E. Mann. Several of the emails included conversations about Soon and Baliunas' paper as the controversy was ongoing in 2003 and 2004. In an 18 December 2009 column in The Wall Street Journal, Pat Michaels alleged that pressure from Jones and Mann was responsible for the resignations at Climate Research. On 22 December 2009 von Storch responded in the Wall Street Journal that his resignation as editor of Climate Research had nothing to do with any pressure from Jones, Mann, or anyone else, but instead he "left this post on my own, with no outside pressure, because of insufficient quality control on a bad paper—a skeptic's paper, at that."

The Independent Climate Change Email Review, an independent review funded by the University of East Anglia and chaired by Sir Muir Russell, examined allegations that the emails showed attempts to undermine normal procedures of publication. Phil Jones gave evidence that he believed the paper showed self-evident errors and the reaction was both proper and proportionate: the review noted that the publisher Otto Kinne had admitted that the paper had problems, and considered that Jones could not reasonably be criticised for his reaction. A paper prepared for the review by Richard Horton, editor of The Lancet, showed that strong responses were not uncommon in the peer review process. The review concluded that the strong reaction to the Soon and Baliunas paper "was understandable, and did not amount to undue pressure on Climate Research.

In petitions to the United States Environmental Protection Agency (EPA), the Coalition for Responsible Regulation, the Ohio Coal Association, Peabody Energy, the Southeastern Legal Foundation, and the State of Texas argued that emails from March and April 2003 showed scientists discussing a boycott of the journal Climate Research and trying to get de Freitas removed, leading to the resignations of editors. They quoted Phil Jones writing that "I will be e-mailing the journal to tell them I'm having nothing more to do with it until they rid themselves of this troublesome editor", and Mann's email response that "I think we have to stop considering 'Climate Research' as a legitimate peer-reviewed journal. We would also need to consider what we tell or request of our more reasonable colleagues who currently sit on the editorial board. Perhaps we should encourage our colleagues in the climate research community to no longer submit to, or cite papers in, this journal." Tom Wigley wrote that von Storch "is partly to blame — he encourages the publication of crap science 'in order to stimulate debate'. One approach is to go direct to the publishers and point out the fact that their journal is perceived as being a medium for disseminating misinformation under the guise of refereed work." The EPA noted that the publisher Kinne had later agreed that the peer review process was flawed, and editors had then resigned as they could not get him to agree corrective action. The emails expressed displeasure but did not show that any action was in fact taken, and it is "expected and appropriate that researchers choose in which journals to publish, as well as recommend to their peers journals in which to publish or not publish. In this case, the bottom line is that the underlying science at issue has been shown to be flawed. The scientists' actions were focused on this lack of scientific merit and the process that lead to it, and not an attempt to distort the science or the scientific literature." The EPA considered that "If anything, their actions aimed to police the peer review process and rectify a problem that threatened its scientific integrity."
