= Willie Soon =

Astrophysicist and climate change denier

- Born: September 30, 1965 (age 61); Kangar, Malaysia
- Education: University of Southern California (B.Sc., M.Sc., Ph.D.)
- Awards: Petr Beckmann Award (2004)
- Scientific career
- Fields: Earth science, solar physics
- Workplaces: Harvard–Smithsonian Center for Astrophysics
- Thesis: Non-equilibrium kinetics in high-temperature gases (1991)
- Doctoral advisor: Joseph Kunc

Willie Wei-Hock Soon (born September 30, 1965) is a Malaysian-American astrophysicist and aerospace engineer who was long employed as a part-time externally funded researcher at the Solar and Stellar Physics (SSP) Division of the Harvard–Smithsonian Center for Astrophysics.

Soon is an anthropogenic climate change denier, disputing the scientific understanding of climate change, and contends that most global warming is caused by solar variation rather than by human activity. He co-wrote a paper whose methodology was widely criticised by the scientific community. Climate scientists such as Gavin Schmidt of the Goddard Institute for Space Studies have refuted Soon's arguments, and the Smithsonian does not support his conclusions. He is nonetheless frequently cited by politicians opposed to climate-change legislation.

Soon co-authored The Maunder Minimum and the Variable Sun–Earth Connection with Steven H. Yaskell. The book treats historical and proxy records of climate change coinciding with the Maunder Minimum, a period from 1645 to about 1715 when sunspots became exceedingly rare.

From 2005 to 2015, Soon had received over $1.2 million from the fossil fuel industry, while failing to disclose that conflict of interest in most of his work. As is standard for externally funded researchers at the CfA, over half of this funding went on the Smithsonian's facility operating costs, with the remainder going to Soon as his salary.

== Early life and education ==
Willie Soon was born in Kangar, Malaysia, in 1966. He attended Khoon Aik Primary School in Kangar, Perlis, then Sekolah Menengah Syed Sirajudin Secondary School in Jejawi, Perlis, and Sekolah Menengah Dato Sheikh Ahmad Secondary School in Arau, Perlis. To further his education he emigrated to the United States in 1980 and attended the University of Southern California, receiving a B.Sc. in 1985, followed by a M.Sc. in 1987 and then a Ph.D. in Aerospace Engineering [with distinction] in 1991. His doctoral thesis was titled Non-equilibrium kinetics in high-temperature gases. He received the IEEE Nuclear and Plasma Sciences Society Graduate Scholastic Award in 1989 and the Rockwell Dennis Hunt Scholastic Award from the University of Southern California in 1991.

== Career ==
After completing his Ph.D., Soon took up a post-doctoral research position at the Center for Astrophysics | Harvard & Smithsonian. He has since been doing research there in astrophysics and Earth science, now as an externally funded employee. He also was for shorter periods an astronomer at the Mount Wilson Observatory a senior scientist at a conservative think tank, the now defunct George C. Marshall Institute, the chief science adviser to the oil industry-funded Science and Public Policy Institute, and an Adjunct Professor of the Faculty of Science and Environmental Studies of the University of Putra, Malaysia. In 2004, Soon received the "Petr Beckmann Award for outstanding contributions to the defense of scientific truth" from the conservative Doctors for Disaster Preparedness, which Bloomberg News describes as a forum on "fringe-science topics" such as global warming denial and The Guardian as a "fringe political group" and as a "truly bizarre lobby group".

Since 2018 Soon has been a principal of the Center for Environmental Research and Earth Sciences (CERES), which describes itself as a "multi-disciplinary and independent research group."

=== 2003: Climate Research controversy ===
In 2003, Willie Soon was first author on a review paper in the journal Climate Research, with Sallie Baliunas as co-author. This paper concluded that "the 20th century is probably not the warmest nor a uniquely extreme climatic period of the last millennium."

Shortly thereafter, 13 scientists published a refutation of the paper. They raised three main objections: (1) Soon and Baliunas used data reflective of changes in moisture, rather than temperature; (2) they failed to distinguish between regional and hemispheric mean temperature anomalies; and (3) they reconstructed past temperatures from proxy evidence not capable of resolving decadal trends. Soon, Baliunas and geography professor David Legates published a response to these objections.

After disagreement with the publisher and with other members of the editorial board, Hans von Storch, Clare Goodess, and two more members of the journal's ten-member editorial board resigned in protest against what they felt was a failure of the peer review process on the part of the journal. Otto Kinne, managing director of the journal's parent company, eventually stated that "CR [Climate Research] should have been more careful and insisted on solid evidence and cautious formulations before publication" and that "CR should have requested appropriate revisions of the manuscript prior to publication."

Soon and Baliunas were also criticised because they did not disclose that their research was funded in part by the American Petroleum Institute.

=== 2011: Funding controversy ===
In 2011, it emerged that Soon received over $1 million from petroleum and coal interests since 2001. Center for Astrophysics | Harvard & Smithsonian documents obtained by Greenpeace under the US Freedom of Information Act show that the Charles G. Koch Charitable Foundation gave Soon two grants totaling $175,000 in 2005–06 and again in 2010. Multiple grants from the American Petroleum Institute between 2001 and 2007 totalled $274,000, and grants from ExxonMobil totalled $335,000 between 2005 and 2010. Other coal and oil industry sources which funded him include the Mobil Foundation, the Texaco Foundation and the Electric Power Research Institute. Soon stated that he has "never been motivated by financial reward in any of my scientific research" and "would have accepted money from Greenpeace if they had offered it to do my research."

Putting forward health reasons, in 2011 Soon went from full-time employment by the Smithsonian at the Center for Astrophysics | Harvard & Smithsonian to a part-time position. The Center's spokesman said "Willie's opinions regarding climate change are his personal views not shared within our research organization". Its former director Irwin Shapiro said no attempt had been made to suppress Soon's views, and there had been no complaints from other scientists there: "As far as I can tell, no one pays any attention to him." Soon has been defended by others agreeing with his views. In 2013, theoretical physicist Freeman Dyson wrote in an email to The Boston Globe: "The whole point of science is to question accepted dogmas. For that reason, I respect Willie Soon as a good scientist and a courageous citizen." The late Republican Senator Jim Inhofe had cited Soon, and Inhofe's former director of communications Marc Morano said that "Willie Soon is a hero of the skeptical movement. When you are an early pioneer, you are going to face the scrutiny and attacks." Soon has links with conservative groups which promote his writings to influence the public debate on climate change, including The Heartland Institute, and the Committee for a Constructive Tomorrow. In a speech at The Heritage Foundation, he accused the IPCC of being "a pure bully" engaged in "blatant manipulations of fact", and said "Stop politicizing science! Just stop!"

=== January 2015 Monckton et al. paper ===
With William M. Briggs, geography professor David Legates, and journalist and British politician Christopher Monckton, Soon co-authored a paper published by the Chinese Science Bulletin in 2015. Climatologist Gavin Schmidt described the paper as "complete trash". He said that the model used is not new, "they arbitrarily restrict its parameters and then declare all other models wrong."

=== 2015: Disclosure violations ===
Soon, as a researcher at the Center for Astrophysics | Harvard & Smithsonian (CfA), is a part-time employee of the Smithsonian Institution, a government agency covered by the Freedom of Information Act (FOIA). Greenpeace worker Kert Davies made a succession of FOIA requests for Soon's correspondence and grant arrangements and in 2014 was given documents disclosing arrangements both Soon and the CfA had with funders. Later in 2014, Davies left Greenpeace to become executive director of a newly founded non-profit, Climate Investigations Center.

The Smithsonian does not fund Soon, who "pursues external grants to fund his research." This funding had exceeded US$1.5 million since 2001; under standard CfA procedures for externally funded researchers, more than half of the $1.2 million funding since 2005 had gone towards the Smithsonian's facility operating costs, with the remainder being passed on to Soon as his salary. Other researchers there have a similar arrangement, but nearly all of their funding comes through peer-reviewed award processes from government bodies such as NASA and the National Science Foundation, whereas Soon has received very little federal money. Soon's funding by private interests is highly unusual at the Smithsonian. It included at least $230,000 from the Charles G. Koch Foundation which is associated with the oil industry and $469,560 from the Southern Company which uses coal to generate electricity. ExxonMobil and the American Petroleum Institute also provided funding, which was later replaced by anonymous donors through the Donors Trust, a donor-advised fund that offers anonymity to clients who do not wish to make their donations public. The latter was identified by a 2013 Drexel University study as the largest single provider of money to political efforts to fight climate-change policy. A 2008 contract agreed to by the CfA required the institute to notify the Southern Company before disclosing that Southern had provided funding, and both the CfA and Willie Soon to provide Southern with advance copies of any publications "for comment and input", though the company could not block publications or require changes.

The Chinese Science Bulletin has a strict policy requiring disclosure of "all relationships or interests that could influence or bias the work", including "professional interests or personal beliefs that may influence your research", for example previous receipt of research grants. The Monckton et al. paper published in January 2015 included a statement by the authors, including Soon, that they had no conflict of interest, and Davies wrote to the journal about the undisclosed funding shown by the documents. On 24 January the journal replied that they would "look into the matter as appropriate". The story was published by The Boston Globe on 26 January with a statement by Monckton that allegations of failure to disclose a material conflict of interest were untrue, as the authors had not "received any funding whatsoever for our research, which was conducted in our own time". He said that the Heartland Institute had provided funding to make the paper available to the public on the journal's website.

On February 21, publications including The Guardian and The New York Times reported that Soon had failed to disclose conflicts of interest in at least 11 papers since 2008, and alleged that Soon had violated ethical guidelines of at least eight of those journals publishing his work. Charles R. Alcock, director of the Center for Astrophysics | Harvard & Smithsonian, described the disclosure violations as "inappropriate behavior" that they would "have to handle with Dr. Soon internally". On the same day, Nature reported that the CfA had launched an investigation into whether Soon had properly reported the funding arrangements shown in the documents. Alcock said "We want to get the facts straight. If there is evidence of failure to disclose, yes, we have a problem." He said that the contract with Southern preventing disclosure of their funding "was a mistake", and in a later email reply to questions said "We will not permit similar wording in future grant agreements". The Smithsonian announced that its Inspector General would investigate, and in addition there was to be a full review of the Smithsonian's ethics and disclosure policies about sponsored research, led by former NSF director Rita R. Colwell.

On March 2, 2015, The Heartland Institute conservative think tank released a statement by Soon, which said he had "been the target of attacks in the press by various radical environmental and politically motivated groups". He described this as "a shameless attempt to silence my scientific research and writings, and to make an example out of me as a warning to any other researcher who may dare question in the slightest their fervently held orthodoxy of anthropogenic global warming." Some of the journals that had published Soon's work had begun reviewing the papers in relation to their policies requiring disclosure: Soon said he had "always complied with what I understood to be disclosure practices in my field generally". He would be "happy to comply" if they required further disclosure, and "would ask only that other authors—on all sides of the debate—are also required to make similar disclosures."

He also requested that journalists who had reported on his actions similarly examined disclosure by other scientists. An investigation by InsideClimate News could find no cases where mainstream climatologists had failed to disclose the funding of their research. Unlike Soon, who had approached private funders directly, their funding was almost entirely obtained through open competitive peer-reviewed applications to public bodies. Climate scientist Andrew Dessler said "People always acknowledge their grants, and that's not really an issue". Though it was almost certain that a disclosure issue could arise, intentionally or otherwise, no instances were known. The nearest case was raised by Steven Milloy's "Junk Science" blog when Nature Climate Change published a 2012 study by meteorologist Kerry Emanuel, who was paid a fixed amount by two companies to sit on their board. Although the companies did not fund his research, the journal then added disclosure of these board memberships. The blog raised the same concern about a paper published a year later, but Proceedings of the National Academy of Sciences decided this disclosure was not required.

In April 2015, a Southern Company spokesman said "Our agreement with the Smithsonian Astrophysical Observatory expires later this year and there are no plans to renew it". It still required Soon to produce a study on "Solar Activity Variation on Multiple Timescales" by November 2015.

== See also ==
- Proxy (climate)
- Solar variation
