= Sherwood B. Idso =

American physicist (born 1942)

Sherwood Idso
- Born: June 12, 1942 (age 84); Thief River Falls, Minnesota, U.S.
- Died: June 12th, 2024
- Resting place: Mesa Cemetery
- Education: University of Minnesota
- Awards: Arthur S. Flemming Award (1977), Petr Beckmann Award (2003)
- Scientific career
- Fields: Climatology, Ecology, Soil Science
- Workplaces: University of Minnesota, U.S. Department of Agriculture, Center for the Study of Carbon Dioxide and Global Change
- Thesis: The photosynthetic response of plants to their environment: a holocoenotic method of analysis (1967)

Sherwood B. Idso (born June 12, 1942) was the president of the Center for the Study of Carbon Dioxide and Global Change, which rejects the scientific consensus on climate change. Previously he was a Research Physicist with the U.S. Department of Agriculture's Agricultural Research Service at the U.S. Water Conservation Laboratory in Phoenix, Arizona, where he worked since June 1967. He was also closely associated with Arizona State University over most of this period, serving as an adjunct professor in the Departments of Geology, Geography, and Botany and Microbiology. His two sons, Craig and Keith, are, respectively, the founder and vice president of the Center for the Study of Carbon Dioxide and Global Change.

Idso was the author or co-author of over 500 publications including the books Carbon Dioxide: Friend or Foe? (1982) and Carbon Dioxide and Global Change: Earth in Transition (1989). He served on the editorial board of the international journal Agricultural and Forest Meteorology from 1973 to 1993 and since 1993 has served on the editorial board of Environmental and Experimental Botany. Over the course of his career, he has been an reviewer of manuscripts for 56 different scientific journals and 17 different funding agencies, representing an array of disciplines. He is an ISI highly cited researcher.

== Early life and education ==
Sherwood Idso was born in Thief River Falls, Minnesota on June 12, 1942, where he lived until graduating from high school in 1960 as valedictorian. Idso also attended the Institute of Technology at the University of Minnesota, receiving a B.Phys. in Physics with distinction in 1964, followed by an M.S. in Soil Science (with a minor in Physics) in 1966 and then a Ph.D. in Soil Science (with a minor in Meteorology and Mechanical Engineering) in 1968. His doctoral thesis was titled, The photosynthetic response of plants to their environment: a holocoenotic method of analysis.

== Climate science ==
In 1972, Idso published an article called "An American Haboob", in which he documented a large dust storm in Arizona which occurred on July 16, 1971, and which stretched from Tucson to Phoenix.

In 1980, Idso published research which concluded that climate sensitivity was probably only about 0.3 °C, about a tenth of the generally accepted value. The following year, he opposed NASA's global warming predictions, saying they were "about 10 times too great," adding that, in his view, global warming would have a beneficial effect on agriculture.

In 1984, Idso, along with A.J. Brazel, published a study in Nature which concluded, contrary to a report the National Academy of Sciences released the previous year, that rising CO_{2} levels would increase streamflow. The study's authors argued that the NAS report came to the opposite conclusion because it neglected the effect of rising CO_{2} levels on plants.

In the 1997 book, Global Warming: The Science and the Politics Idso said: "I find no compelling reason to believe that the earth will necessarily experience any global warming as a consequence of the ongoing rise in the atmosphere's carbon dioxide concentration."

In the 1998 paper, CO_{2}-induced global warming: a skeptic's view of potential climate change Idso said: "Several of these cooling forces have individually been estimated to be of equivalent magnitude, but of opposite sign, to the typically predicted greenhouse effect of a doubling of the air’s CO_{2} content, which suggests to me that little net temperature change will ultimately result from the ongoing buildup of CO_{2} in Earth's atmosphere."

== Personal life ==
=== Religion and Marriage ===
Idso was a member of the Church of Jesus Christ of Latter-Day Saints. He was married and sealed to Carolyn Marie Wakefield in the Logan, Utah temple on August 23, 1963, whom he referred to as "the most beautiful woman in the world" in his diary.

=== Family Life and Pastimes ===
Sherwood and Carolyn had seven children: his sons Grant, Keith, Craig, Lance, Wayne, and his daughters Jennifer and Julene. Idso was described as a very intelligent man, but also one who had a "great sense of humor." Idso held a lifelong fascination with nature as well as an enjoyment of photography, of which produced a variety of hobbies, such as capturing pictures of small creatures or assisting in the creation of a saltwater pond in the family home backyard.

== Death ==
Idso died on June 12, 2024, on his 82nd birthday. He is interred in the Mesa City Cemetery in Mesa, AZ, and is survived by his wife, Carolyn.

== Awards ==
- 1977 - Arthur S. Flemming Award in recognition of "his innovative research into fundamental aspects of agricultural-climatological interrelationships affecting food production and the identification of achievable research goals whose attainment could significantly aid in assessment and improvement of world food supplies."
- 2003 - Petr Beckmann Award for "courage and achievement in defense of scientific truth and freedom."
- 2014 - Frederick Seitz Memorial Award (presented by Heartland Institute)

== Selected publications ==
- Idso, Sherwood B. (1980). "The Climatological Significance of a Doubling of Earth's Atmospheric Carbon Dioxide Concentration". Science. 207 (4438): 1462–1463. Bibcode:1980Sci...207.1462I. doi:10.1126/science.207.4438.1462. PMID 17779615. S2CID 28241864.
- Idso, S. B.; Brazel, A. J. (1984). "Rising atmospheric carbon dioxide concentrations may increase streamflow". Nature. 312 (5989): 51–53. Bibcode:1984Natur.312...51I. doi:10.1038/312051a0. S2CID 4341851.
- Idso, S. B. (1988). "Greenhouse warming or Little Ice Age demise: A critical problem for climatology". Theoretical and Applied Climatology. 39 (1): 54–56. Bibcode:1988ThApC..39...54I. doi:10.1007/BF00867657. S2CID 121405669.
- Idso, Keith E.; Idso, Sherwood B. (1994). "Plant responses to atmospheric CO_{2} enrichment in the face of environmental constraints: a review of the past 10 years' research". Agricultural and Forest Meteorology. 64 (3–4): 153–203. Bibcode:1994AgFM...69..153I. doi:10.1016/0168-1923(94)90025-6.
- Idso, Sherwood B. (1998). "CO_{2}-induced global warming: a skeptic's view of potential climate change". Climate Research. 10 (1): 69–82. Bibcode:1998ClRes..10...69I. doi:10.3354/cr010069.
- Kimball, Bruce A.; Idso, Sherwood B.; Johnson, Stephanie; Rillig, Matthias C. (2007). "Seventeen years of carbon dioxide enrichment of sour orange trees: final results". Global Change Biology. 13 (10): 2171–2183. Bibcode:2007GCBio..13.2171K. doi:10.1111/j.1365-2486.2007.01430.x. S2CID 9633643.
