= Paul Driessen =

Paul Driessen may refer to:

- Paul Driessen (lobbyist) (born 1948), American author and lobbyist
- Paul Driessen (animator) (born 1940) Dutch film director, animator and writer
