= William Kininmonth =

William Kininmonth may refer to:

- William Kininmonth (architect) (1904–1988), Scottish architect
- William Kininmonth (meteorologist), retired Australian meteorologist
