= Sonja Boehmer-Christiansen =

German geologist

- Born: 1942 (age 83–84); Dresden, Germany
- Citizenship: German, Australian, British
- Education: University of Adelaide, University of Sussex
- Scientific career
- Fields: Environmental policy, geography
- Workplaces: University of Sussex, University of Hull
- Thesis: Limits to the international control of marine pollution (1981)

Sonja Boehmer-Christiansen (born 1942) is an emeritus reader in the department of Geography at the University of Hull in Kingston upon Hull England, where she taught environmental policy, management and politics. She was editor of the journal Energy & Environment from 1998 to 2017.

== Early life and education ==
Sonja Boehmer-Christiansen was born in Dresden, East Germany. In 1956, she moved to Adelaide, South Australia, where she obtained a BA with honours in Geomorphology from the University of Adelaide while also studying climatology, geology, physical geography, and German literature. She moved again to England in 1969 and later attended the University of Sussex where she first obtained an MA followed by a DPhil in international relations in 1981. Her doctoral thesis was titled, Limits to the international control of marine pollution.

== Career ==
Boehmer-Christiansen joined the Science Policy Research Unit at the University of Sussex in 1985, working for a decade as a research fellow and then later as a visiting fellow. Since the mid-1990s she had taught environmental policy, management and politics in the Geography Department at the University of Hull. As an Emeritus Reader she still works from the University of Hull's Geography Department.

She is a past member of the United Nations Environment Programme Stakeholder Forum for a Sustainable Future.

== Views on climate change ==
When asked about the publication in the spring of 2003 of a revised version of the paper at the center of the Soon and Baliunas controversy, Boehmer-Christiansen said, "I'm following my political agenda -- a bit, anyway. But isn't that the right of the editor?"

Boehmer-Christiansen has been a critic of climate models saying they are based on data that cannot be verified. In 2006, she signed an open letter to Canadian Prime Minister Stephen Harper urging him to open the Kyoto Protocol to debate by holding balanced, comprehensive public-consultation sessions on the Canadian government's climate change plans.

She describes herself as agnostic on whether humans are causing global warming, and believes its negative aspects to be politically exaggerated.

== Third-party views ==
According to Fred Pearce, Boehmer-Christiansen is a sceptic about acid rain and global warming and calls the science reports produced by the Intergovernmental Panel on Climate Change "political constructs."

The Guardian reported that Boehmer-Christiansen published – against the recommendations of a reviewer – a paper in Energy & Environment claiming that the sun is made of iron.

== Selected publications ==
Books

- Boehmer-Christiansen, Sonja; Skea, Jim (1991). Acid politics: Environmental and energy policies in Britain and Germany. Belhaven Press. ISBN 978-1852931162. Archived from the original on 20 February 2014.
- Boehmer-Christiansen, Sonja; Weidner, Helmut (1995). The politics of reducing vehicle emissions in Britain and Germany. London and Madison. ISBN 978-1855672031. Archived from the original on 20 February 2014.
- Boehmer-Christiansen, Sonja; Kellow, Aynsley J. (2002). International Environmental Policy: Interests and the Failure of the Kyoto Process. Edward Elgar Publishing. ISBN 978-1840648188.

Journal articles

- Boehmer-Christiansen, Sonja (January 1982). "The scientific basis of marine pollution control". Marine Policy. 6 (1): 2–10. Bibcode:1982MarPo...6....2B. doi:10.1016/0308-597X(82)90038-0.
- Boehmer-Christiansen, Sonja (1997). "A winning coalition of advocacy: climate research, bureaucracy and 'alternative' fuels: Who is driving climate change policy?". Energy Policy. 25 (4): 439–444. Bibcode:1997EnPol..25..439B. doi:10.1016/S0301-4215(97)00016-5.
- Boehmer-Christiansen, Sonja (2002). "The geo-politics of sustainable development: bureaucracies and politicians in search of the holy grail". Geoforum. 33 (3): 351–365. doi:10.1016/S0016-7185(02)00018-0.
- Boehmer-Christiansen, Sonja (2003). "Science, Equity, and the War against Carbon". Science, Technology, & Human Values. 28 (1): 69–92. doi:10.1177/0162243902238496. S2CID 153759038.

== See also ==
- Marine pollution
