= Doctors for Disaster Preparedness =

Non-profit organization in Tucson, Arizona

- Founded: 1984
- Type: 501(c)(3)
- Tax ID no.: 592414338
- Purpose: Disaster Preparedness
- Location: Tucson, Arizona
- Key people: Jane M. Orient, President; Arthur B. Robinson, Vice-President
- Revenue: $58,633
- Website: www.ddponline.org

Doctors for Disaster Preparedness (DDP) is a 501(c)(3) non-profit organization located in Tucson, Arizona. The group is closely affiliated with the American Association of Physicians and Surgeons, a politically conservative nonprofit association advocating numerous discredited hypotheses including AIDS denialism. It is run by Arizona physician Jane Orient.

According to Bloomberg News, the group was "founded to promote civil defense during the Cold War", and has been "transformed over the years into a forum" on "fringe-science topics" such as global warming denial. DDP was described by The Guardian as a "fringe political group" and as a "truly bizarre lobby group". It promotes the denialist view that man-made global warming is not real or not an important concern.

== Affiliations ==
Doctors for Disaster Preparedness share the same address with AAPS.

- DDP President Jane Orient is also the Executive Director of the Association of American Physicians and Surgeons (AAPS).
- DDP Vice-President Arthur B. Robinson is also the President of the Oregon Institute of Science and Medicine (OISM).

== Petr Beckmann Award ==
The Petr Beckmann Award for courage and achievement in defense of scientific truth and freedom' is awarded at the annual meeting of the Doctors for Disaster Preparedness. The award is named for Petr Beckmann, an electrical engineer and libertarian who challenged Albert Einstein's theory of relativity. The Guardian described the Beckmann Award as "handed out by obscure rightwing lobbyists". The following people have received this award:

- 1995 - Jane Orient
- 1996 - Robert Jastrow
- 1997 - Sallie Baliunas
- 1998 - Arthur B. Robinson
- 2000 - S. Fred Singer
- 2003 - Sherwood B. Idso
- 2004 - Willie Soon
- 2012 - Marc Morano

Especially Morano's selection was criticized in The Guardian, as Morano had previously republished the email address of a climate scientist who had received death threats. Morano wrote of climate scientists: "I seriously believe we should kick them while they're down. They deserve to be publicly flogged."

== Annual meetings ==
In August 2015 the group held its 33rd annual meeting. While attacks on mainstream climate science are "a staple", the meeting provides a forum to a "broad" range of material. Presentations at the 2015 meeting included a theory about links between John F. Kennedy’s assassination and the deaths of his brother and son; a prediction that the aim of Obamacare was to cause the collapse the U.S. health-care system and a recommendation "that the audience start stockpiling medications and finding doctors who would work for cash"; a sympathetic discussion of the theory that low doses of radiation are "beneficial to human health"; and an argument that the HIV virus does not cause AIDS, but instead was invented by government scientists who wanted to cover up other health risks of “the lifestyle of homosexual men.” The meeting was covered by conservative website Breitbart, attended by George Gilder, and the conservative Heartland Institute sent its science director to present his plan to abolish the Environmental Protection Agency.

== Political views ==
Doctors for Disaster Preparedness President Jane Orient has asserted that the Intergovernmental Panel on Climate Change reports are unreliable and that relevant data was "hidden, locked in the clutches of the elite few" because the data would "decisively disproves their computer models and shows that their draconian emission controls are based on nothing except a lust for power, control and profit."

After a reported increase in fallout-shelter construction since the September 11, 2001, attacks on the United States, she was quoted as saying, "They're treating me less like a crazy woman than they did before."

== Funding ==
Computer scientist and hedge fund manager Robert Mercer has been a donor to DDP.
