= Keith E. Idso =

American botanist

Keith Edward Idso
- Education: University of Arizona, Arizona State University
- Scientific career
- Fields: Botany
- Workplaces: Center for the Study of Carbon Dioxide and Global Change
- Thesis: Partial purification and characterization of three environmentally-sensitive proteins from sour orange tree leaves (1997)

Keith E. Idso is a botanist and vice president of the Center for the Study of Carbon Dioxide and Global Change. He is the brother of Craig D. Idso and son of Sherwood B. Idso. He received his B.S. in Agriculture with a major in Plant Sciences from the University of Arizona and his M.S. from the same institution with a major in Agronomy and Plant Genetics. He completed his Ph.D. in Botany at Arizona State University. In 1994, Idso, along with his father, published a review paper on the topic of increased CO_{2} levels and their effects on plant growth. The paper concluded that not only did other factors not diminish the ability of CO_{2} to increase plant growth rates, that "the data show the relative growth-enhancing effects of atmospheric CO_{2} enrichment to be greatest when resource limitations and environmental stresses are most severe." As of 1999, he was teaching biology in the Maricopa County Community College District as an adjunct professor, a post to which he was appointed in 1996.

In July 1998, Idso spoke at the Doctors for Disaster Preparedness' 16th annual meeting in Scottsdale, Arizona. His talk was entitled "Direct Biological Effects of Increasing Levels of Atmospheric Carbon Dioxide." In 1999, Idso was appointed by the Speaker of the Arizona House of Representatives to serve on the Arizona Advisory Council on Environmental Education.
