= Science and Public Policy Institute =

American climate change denial think tank

The Science and Public Policy Institute (SPPI) is a United States public policy organization which promotes climate change denial.

== Background ==
The mission of the nonprofit advocacy group Science and Public Policy Institute is to promote "sound public policy based on sound science."

With a strong emphasis on global warming denial, SPPI was established in the middle of 2007. It heavily references works by climate change science denier Christopher Monckton, who served as editor of the organization's "Monthly CO2 Report", has published many of his works with SPPI, and who is also listed as the organization's "Chief Policy Advisor."

The SPPI has analyzed the states for observed climate change and the impact or expense of climate change regulations or prevention measures, in addition to releasing original articles on subjects including climate change and mercury in the environment. SPPI has been called a "front" for the Center for the Study of Carbon Dioxide and Global Change (CSCDGC), with whom it frequently co-publishes papers.

== Staff ==
The organization's executive director is Robert Ferguson, and the chief policy adviser is Christopher Monckton. Joe D'Aleo is the institute's Meteorology Adviser. Further science advisers, as listed in 2011, include:

- Robert M. Carter
- Craig D. Idso
- William Kininmonth
- David Legates

Willie Soon was at one time the chief science advisor.

== Publications ==
The Science and Public Policy Institute funded a film Apocalypse? No! intended to show errors in the Al Gore documentary, An Inconvenient Truth. It shows Monckton giving a presentation to the Cambridge University Union.

The SPPI took an interest in the Climatic Research Unit email controversy ("Climategate"). Its position is elaborated in a 45-page paper released in December 2009, titled "Climategate: Caught Green-Handed!: Cold facts about the hot topic of global temperature change after the Climategate scandal", which concluded that global warming is a myth.

== Funding ==
The Institute is operated by The Frontiers of Freedom Foundation, Inc., a policy organization founded in 1996 by former Senator Malcolm Wallop, Republican of Wyoming. On its website SPPI does not detail the sources of its funding. In 2002, Frontiers of Freedom had a budget of $700,000, with fossil-fuel company Exxon-Mobil donating $230,000 of that sum.
