= Climate Hustle =

- Directed by: Christopher Rogers
- Written by: Marc Morano; Mick Curran
- Produced by: Christopher Rogers
- Narrated by: Marc Morano
- Production company: CFACT Presents
- Distributed by: Fathom Events
- Release date: May 2, 2016
- Country: United States
- Language: English

Climate Hustle is a 2016 film rejecting the existence and cause of climate change, narrated by climate change denialist Marc Morano, produced and directed by Christopher Rogers, co-written by Morano and Mick Curran, and funded by the Committee for a Constructive Tomorrow (CFACT), a free market pressure group funded by the fossil fuel lobby.

According to Ars Technica, the film offers "a fast-paced, uninterrupted delivery of superficial and false claims about climate science".

== Synopsis ==
Climate Hustle challenges the scientific consensus on climate change, arguing that the consensus is overstated and part of an "environmental con job being used to push for increased government regulations and a new 'Green' energy agenda". It offers a series of segments which present arguments that function to cast doubt on aspects of the consensus, pointing to perceived inconsistencies, errors, and political hypotheses. Sections include interviews and commentary by Morano.

It begins with an explanation of three-card Monte, a confidence game scam offered as a metaphor for climate change arguments.

== Production ==
Climate Hustle was directed and produced by Christopher Rogers, president of Washington, D.C.–based media production company CDR Communications.

The conservative group Committee for a Constructive Tomorrow (CFACT) provided funding. The film is billed as a "CFACT Presents" production, and the organization's president and executive director, David Rothbard and Craig Rucker, are credited as executive producers. CFACT also sponsors Morano's blog, Climate Depot.

=== Release ===
Climate Hustle premiered in Paris, France, on 7 December 2015, coinciding with the 2015 United Nations Climate Change Conference. Its U.S. premiere was held on 14 April 2016 at the Rayburn Building on Capitol Hill in Washington, D.C., and was followed by a discussion panel that included former Alaska governor Sarah Palin and David Legates, a climatologist and geology professor at the University of Delaware whose work is funded by Koch Industries and other fossil-fuel sponsors. It was moderated by conservative writer Brent Bozell. U.S. Representative Lamar S. Smith, Republican of Texas, was set to attend but instead prepared opening remarks which included an accusation that U.S. government agencies had tampered with climate data.

It was shown for one day in 400 theaters across the United States on 2 May 2016.

In an interview with Variety about the film, Palin explained her passion for the issue, offering an anecdote about her 2008 lawsuit against the U.S. government, challenging the polar bear's placement on the threatened species list under the Endangered Species Act. Palin took issue with the forecasting data produced by biologists and environmental groups that showed a threat due to declining Arctic sea ice, although a federal judge backed the scientists' original findings.

The film's cinema engagement is managed by Fathom Events and SpectiCast.

== Reception ==
Writing for The New York Times, Randy Olson, who had previously interviewed Morano for his own mockumentary film, Sizzle: A Global Warming Comedy (2008), called Climate Hustle "boring", with "the light-hearted and entertaining feel of a Michael Moore film, but [not] in the same league." Olson did not comment on the scientific or pseudoscientific content, instead evaluating the film from a cinematic perspective. While he found the editing to be "decent", he criticized quality of the visuals, lighting, and explained the narrative structure as a series of sequences which all come to the same conclusion: "climate scientists have it all wrong and are conspiring to deceive the public." Ars Technica likewise panned the film, saying its "sections all run together, with topics appearing multiple times and with no real thread to follow."

For The Guardian's Suzanne Goldberg, "the real mission for Palin and the makers of the movie – in addition to airing various conspiracy theories – was to register the continued existence of a small but still powerful fringe, even as the rest of the world accelerates its efforts to fight climate change."

Several reviewers have drawn comparisons to Al Gore's 2006 documentary An Inconvenient Truth.

=== Criticism of scientific content ===
The film's basis is in a rejection of the overwhelming scientific consensus about climate change and the impact of human activities on it.

The Guardian was critical of the film's "[dismissing] global warming as an excuse for government takeover and [making] the outrageously false claim that rising carbon emissions are beneficial." The Washington Post called it a "tour through the arguments that some holdout scientists do still make to undermine mainstream climate concerns." The Post challenges the validity of several of the film's claims directly, which it characterizes as "the same things they've been arguing for many years, albeit with regular touch-ups."

Ars Technica likened the film's style to a "Gish Gallop", calling it "a fast-paced, uninterrupted delivery of superficial and false claims about climate science" which forms "an 80-minute-long list of all the climate 'skeptic' blogosphere's favorite claims."

The film features a number of expert testimonies in support of its claims. According to Scott K. Johnson of Ars Technica, those who "could fairly call themselves climate scientists [are] drawn from the small stable of familiar contrarians that cycle through Congressional hearing when contrarian witnesses are in demand" while others are "straight out of the Rolodex of the Heartland Institute".
