= Claudia Wagner-Riddle =

Canadian agrometeorologist

- Born: 1961 (age 64–65); Rolandia, Brazil

Academic background
- Education: B.Sc., M.Sc., agrometeorology, University of São Paulo; PhD, 1992, University of Guelph
- Thesis: The Effect of Rye Mulch on Soybean Yield: A Field and Modelling Study (1992)

Claudia Wagner-Riddle (born 1961) is a Canadian agrometeorologist. She is a professor in agrometeorology in the School of Environmental Sciences at the University of Guelph and editor-in-chief of the journal Agricultural and Forest Meteorology. In 2020, Wagner-Riddle was appointed director of the North America regional chapter of the International Nitrogen Initiative and elected a fellow of the American Meteorological Society.

== Early life and education ==
Wagner-Riddle was born in 1961 and raised in Rolandia, Brazil, where she completed her first two degrees in agronomic engineering at the University of São Paulo. Upon completing her undergraduate degree, she accepted a research position in Germany looking at soil erosion which inspired her to pursue graduate research in the subject. As a result, she travelled to North America and enrolled at the University of Guelph's Department of Land Resource Science for her PhD.

== Career ==
Upon completing her PhD, Wagner-Riddle joined the faculty at her alma mater, the University of Guelph, in 1994. Beginning in 2008, she has been collaborating with organizations from her homeland, Brazil, in documenting the impact that management of agriculture has on greenhouse gas emissions. Wagner-Riddle was also elected to the Ontario Agricultural College Board of Directors and contributed to the development of the Nitrous Oxide Emission Reduction Protocol. Her research led to a cross-Canada partnership of government, industry and universities in green agriculture technologies to benefit Canadian farmers. In 2011, Gerry Ritz granted the university nearly $4 million in grant funds to study and develop tools to help farmers mitigate greenhouse gas emissions. She also received $2.8 million from the federal Agricultural Greenhouse Gases Program to lead a research project to lower the carbon footprint of dairy farming in Canada. The following year, Wagner-Riddle was named a YMCA–YWCA Women of Distinction Award for her "efforts to integrate the life and physical sciences to address environmental problems".

In 2012, Wagner-Riddle was appointed editor-in-chief of the journal Agricultural and Forest Meteorology. While serving in this role, she also became the director of the University of Guelph's Soil Health Interpretive Centre where she teaches visitors about soils as ecosystems. A few years later, she was elected a fellow of the Canadian Society of Agricultural and Forest Meteorology. In 2020, Wagner-Riddle was appointed director of the North America regional chapter of the International Nitrogen Initiative and elected a fellow of the American Meteorological Society.
