= Craig D. Idso =

American geographer and think tank founder

- Born: United States
- Education: Arizona State University (BS); University of Nebraska–Lincoln (MS, PhD)
- Scientific career
- Fields: Agronomy, Climatology, Geography
- Workplaces: Arizona State University, Center for the Study of Carbon Dioxide and Global Change
- Thesis: Amplitude and phase changes in the seasonal atmospheric CO_{2} cycle in the Northern Hemisphere (1998)
- Doctoral advisor: Robert Balling
- Website: www.co2science.org

Craig D. Idso is the founder, president and current chairman of the board of the Center for the Study of Carbon Dioxide and Global Change, a group which receives funding from ExxonMobil and Peabody Energy and which promotes climate change denial. He is the brother of Keith E. Idso and son of Sherwood B. Idso.

== Early life and education ==
After growing up in Tempe, Arizona, Idso received his B.S. in Geography from Arizona State University, his M.S. in Agronomy from the University of Nebraska–Lincoln in 1996, and his Ph.D. in geography from Arizona State University in 1998. His doctoral thesis was titled Amplitude and phase changes in the seasonal atmospheric CO_{2} cycle in the Northern Hemisphere.

== Career ==
Idso remains actively involved in several aspects of global and environmental change, including climatology and meteorology, along with their impacts on agriculture. Idso has published scientific articles on issues related to data quality, the growing season, the seasonal cycle of atmospheric CO_{2}, world food supplies, coral reefs, and urban CO_{2} concentrations, the latter of which he investigated via a National Science Foundation grant as a faculty researcher in the Office of Climatology at Arizona State University. His main focus is on the environmental benefits of carbon dioxide. In addition, he has lectured in meteorology at Arizona State University, and in Physical Geography at Mesa Community College and Chandler-Gilbert Community College.

He is the former Director of Environmental Science at Peabody Energy, and a science adviser to the climate change denialist group The Science and Public Policy Institute, which also receives funding from ExxonMobil.

Idso is a lead author of the reports of the Nongovernmental International Panel on Climate Change (NIPCC), a project sponsored by the Heartland Institute. An unauthorized release of documents indicate Idso received $11,600 per month in 2012 from the Heartland Institute.

He is a member of the American Association for the Advancement of Science, American Geophysical Union, American Meteorological Society, Association of American Geographers, Ecological Society of America, and The Honor Society of Phi Kappa Phi.

== Selected publications ==
- Idso, Craig D.; Idso, Sherwood B.; Balling, Robert C. Jr. (1998). "The Urban CO_{2} Dome of Phoenix, Arizona". Physical Geography. 19 (2): 95–108. Bibcode:1998PhGeo..19...95I. doi:10.1080/02723646.1998.10642642.
- Stooksbury, David E.; Idso, Craig D.; Hubbard, Kenneth G. (1999). "The Effects of Data Gaps on the Calculated Monthly Mean Maximum and Minimum Temperatures in the Continental United States: A Spatial and Temporal Study". Journal of Climate. 12 (5): 1524–1533. Bibcode:1999JCli...12.1524S. doi:10.1175/1520-0442(1999)012<1524:TEODGO>2.0.CO;2.
- Idso, Craig D.; Idso, Sherwood B.; Kimball, Bruce A.; Park, Hyoung-Shin; Hoober, J. Kenneth; Balling Jr., Robert C. (2000). "Ultra-enhanced spring branch growth in CO_{2}-enriched trees: can it alter the phase of the atmosphere's seasonal CO_{2} cycle?". Environmental and Experimental Botany. 43 (2): 91–100. doi:10.1016/S0098-8472(99)00054-4.
- Idso, Craig D.; Idso, Sherwood B.; Balling, Robert C. Jr. (2001). "An intensive two-week study of an urban CO_{2} dome in Phoenix, Arizona, USA". Atmospheric Environment. 35 (6): 995–1000. Bibcode:2001AtmEn..35..995I. doi:10.1016/S1352-2310(00)00412-X.
- Idso, Craig D. (2001). "Earth's rising atmospheric CO_{2} concentration: Impacts on the biosphere". Energy & Environment. 12 (4): 287–310. Bibcode:2001EnEnv..12..287I. doi:10.1260/0958305011500797. S2CID 154334772.
