= Nierenberg Prize =

American science and technology award

The Nierenberg Prize for Science in the Public Interest is given annually by Scripps Institution of Oceanography. It was created through a gift of the family to honor the memory of William Nierenberg. The prize includes a bronze medal and $25,000.

The award is named for William Nierenberg (1919–2000), a renowned national science leader who served the Scripps Institution of Oceanography as director from 1965 to 1986. The recipient of numerous awards and honors for professional research and public service, Nierenberg was a leading expert in several fields of underwater research and warfare, and was known for his work in low-energy nuclear physics.

== Recipients ==
- 2001: E. O. Wilson
- 2002: Walter Cronkite
- 2003: Jane Lubchenco
- 2004: Dame Jane Goodall
- 2005: Sir David Attenborough
- 2006: Gordon Moore
- 2007: John Craig Venter
- 2008: James E. Hansen
- 2009: Richard Dawkins
- 2010: Ira Flatow
- 2012: Daniel Pauly
- 2013: James Cameron
- 2014: Michael Pollan
- 2015: Lord Martin Rees
- 2017: Charles Bolden
- 2018: Svante Pääbo
- 2019: Jennifer Doudna
- 2021: Warren Washington
- 2022: Jesse H. Ausubel
- 2023: Katalin Karikó
- 2024: Jeffrey I. Gordon
- 2026: France A. Córdova

== See also ==
- List of general science and technology awards
