= Marine Ecology Progress Series =

- Discipline: Marine ecology
- Language: English
- Edited by: Myron A. Peck, Katherine Richardson, Paul Snelgrove & Rory P. Wilson

Publication details
- History: 1979-present
- Publisher: Inter Research
- Frequency: 23/year
- Open access: After five years
- Impact factor: 2.915 (2021)

Standard abbreviations
- ISO 4: Mar. Ecol. Prog. Ser.

Indexing
- CODEN: MESEDT
- ISSN: 0171-8630 (print); 1616-1599 (web)
- LCCN: 80642595
- OCLC no.: 05696404

Links
- Journal homepage

The Marine Ecology Progress Series is a peer-reviewed scientific journal that covers all aspects of marine ecology.

== History ==
The journal was founded by Otto Kinne. Its original concept was based on Marine Ecology, also once edited by Kinne and published by John Wiley & Sons.

== Abstracting and indexing ==
The Marine Ecology Progress Series is indexed and abstracted in Biological Abstracts, Scopus, and the Science Citation Index.
