= David Legates =

American professor of geography

David Russell Legates
- Education: Ph.D., University of Delaware
- Known for: Precipitation models
- Scientific career
- Fields: Geography, climatology
- Workplaces: University of Delaware
- Thesis: A climatology of global precipitation (1989)

David Russell Legates is a former professor of geography at the University of Delaware. He is the former Director of the Center for Climatic Research at the same university and a former Delaware state climatologist. In September 2020, the Trump administration appointed him as deputy assistant secretary of commerce for observation and prediction at the National Oceanic and Atmospheric Administration where he served until January, 2021.

Legates has spent much of his career casting doubt on the severity of climate change and the human causes of warming. He is affiliated with the Heartland Institute, a think tank that promotes climate change denial.

Legates is co-author of Hot Talk, Cold Science, a book the publisher describes as showing "the pessimistic, and often alarming, global warming scenarios depicted in the media have no scientific basis." Legates' viewpoint, as stated in a 2015 study that he co-authored, is that the Earth will experience about 1.0 °C (1.8 °F) warming over the 2000 to 2100 period.

As of 2026 Legates is a research fellow at the Independent Institute.

== Early life and education ==
Legates received a bachelor's degree in 1982, a master's degree in 1985, and a Ph.D. in climatology in 1988, all from the University of Delaware.

== Scientific career ==
Legates was a professor of geography at the University of Delaware. He has also taught at Louisiana State University, the University of Oklahoma, and the University of Virginia. He has been a Visiting Research Scientist at the National Climate Data Center.

Legates started his career working on precipitation probability modeling. He extended his research to the study of global precipitation and temperature measurement correlation and performed critical analyses of the quality of traditional water budgeting methods applied to recent better quality measurement data. He also became concerned with the study of the applicability of global circulation prognostication models at the regional and local level. Legates and his team argued for the necessity of technological progress in precipitation measurement used for validating climate change scenarios, and for validation of existing data used for that purpose. They demonstrated disagreement between satellite-based and in-situ precipitation measurements, and pointed out inconsistencies among satellite data processing algorithms. Legates argued for a better adequacy of observation-based climatologies compared to those compiled subjectively. His team concluded that uncorrected centered-pattern correlation statistics applied to the validation of general circulation prognostication models used to predict large-scale climate change may be inappropriate and may yield erroneous results. They proposed modified goodness of fit test methods more suitable for use in hydrologic and hydroclimate model validation. Legates and his coworkers became concerned with the quality of surface instrumental temperature data analysis, treatment and presentation of trends used in the communication of global warming research results.

He co-developed methods to correct biases in gauge-measured precipitation data for wind and temperature effects, with direct applicability in climate change, hydrology and environmental impact studies. His group observed that gauge undercatch was mostly caused by wind turbulence—especially for snow—and has a significant effect on the calculated Arctic water budget. They also studied the correlation between the observed variability in Western US snowpack accumulation and atmospheric circulation in historical measurement data and developed temperature-snowfall correlations based on first principles and observation in order to improve the global radiation balance estimation used in climate change predictions. Legates also developed a calibration method which validates NEXRAD radar precipitation data with gauge measurements to improve the accuracy of precipitation estimates.

Legates and his coworkers extended their research to the development of correlations between satellite crop imaging data and landscape change, crop type and its evolution, and their effects of global climate change. They have also tackled rainfed crop management, modeling and optimization. The group developed a hydrologic model based on meteorological, soil and vegetation measurement data. His groups has demonstrated poor quality of correlation between hydrological cycle data, global runoff and global warming.

Legates and coauthors (including Willie Soon, Sallie Baliunas, and Timothy F. Ball) authored a controversial (and non peer-reviewed) paper in the journal Ecological Complexity attempting to disprove an increase in Hudson Bay temperatures in the past 70 years, and cautioning about polar bear-human interaction as a likely cause for any observed decline in bear populations. In this paper the authors expressed doubts regarding the predictive quality of global warming models at the entire Arctic scale and any extrapolation of polar bear population trends.

Legates's research has been funded by Koch Industries, the American Petroleum Institute, and ExxonMobil.

== Climate change ==
Legates has published research papers, opinion editorials, and spoken openly in opposition to the scientific consensus on climate change. More recently, he has been known for his dismissal of anthropogenic cause of the observed global warming patterns and the severity of its consequences at the local geographical scale.

Legates is a signer of the Oregon Petition, which stated: "There is no convincing scientific evidence that human release of carbon dioxide, methane, or other greenhouse gasses is causing or will, in the foreseeable future, cause catastrophic heating of the Earth's atmosphere and disruption of the Earth's climate. Moreover, there is substantial scientific evidence that increases in atmospheric carbon dioxide produce many beneficial effects upon the natural plant and animal environments of the Earth".

In his testimony to the United States Senate Committee on Environment and Public Works regarding the Mann, Bradley and Hughes hockey stick graph, Legates summed up his position as: "Where we differ with Dr. Mann and his colleagues is in their construction of the hemispheric averaged time-series, their assertion that the 1990s are the warmest decade of the last millennium, and that human influences appear to be the only significant factor on globally averaged air temperature."

In his lectures, Legates has acknowledged that humans have a direct impact on the environment. However he has disputed large scale climatological studies where he claims that researchers fail to incorporate sufficient data involving increased solar activity, water vapor as a greenhouse gas, data contamination through expansion of the urban heat island effect surrounding data collection points, and many other key variables in addition to the human chemical emissions that are the sole focus of many climatological studies.

In October 2009, Dr. Legates and 34 cosigners submitted a letter to the EPA outlining specific objections to the proposed endangerment rule.

Legates is a signatory of the Cornwall Alliance for the Stewardship of Creation's "An Evangelical Declaration on Global Warming".

In February 2007, Delaware governor Ruth Ann Minner wrote a letter to Legates, then Delaware's state climatologist, stating, "Your views on climate change, as I understand them, are not aligned with those of my administration." The governor went on to write:

In light of my position and due to the confusion surrounding your role with the State, I am directing you to offer any future statements on this or other public policy matters only on behalf of yourself or the University of Delaware and not as State Climatologist. I believe that your responsibilities as State Climatologist do not include representing the views of Delaware's Executive Branch, and I understand that you have not provided your opinions as such. It is my sincere hope that you do not view this as an affront to your professional credibility but rather an attempt to ensure that the public better understands the role of the State Climatologist and the distinction between the State Climate Office and Delaware's executive agencies.

— Ruth Ann Minner, governor of Delaware

Legates continued to serve as Delaware's climatologist until 2011.

Legates was a co-author of a 2015 study published by the Chinese Science Bulletin that used a simple climate model predicting an overall trend of approximately 1.0 C warming for the 2000 to 2100 period, drawing upon the historical record of approximately 0.34 C warming from 1990 to 2014. The study's authors, a team made up of Legates with Dr. Willie Soon, Dr. William M. Briggs, and Lord Christopher Monckton, stated that they somewhat agreed with the IPCC's ideas but found the organization's temperature predictions to be largely overstated. The study specifically asserted that warming "may be no more than one-third to one-half of IPCC's summary of current projections".

== Think tanks ==
Legates is affiliated with the Heartland Institute, a leading promoter of climate change denial. When the Heartland Institute presented him with a Courage in Defense of Science Award at its climate conference in 2015, Legates said it was recognition for having been “beaten over the head by a bunch of thugs,” meaning climate scientists and politicians who criticized his work.

As of February 2026 Legates is a Research Fellow at the Independent Institute.

He also was a senior scientist of the now closed-down Marshall Institute, and an adjunct scholar of the Competitive Enterprise Institute.

== Trump administration ==
In September 2020, Legates was appointed as deputy assistant secretary of commerce for observation and prediction at the National Oceanic and Atmospheric Administration in the Trump administration. Many observers believe that Legates does not have the competence or objectivity for this position.

While detailed to the White House Office of Science and Technology Policy Legates commissioned a set of nine briefs known as the "Climate Change Fliers," released in January 2021. The briefs attacked the consensus on climate change, many were written by prominent climate change deniers. The briefs were not vetted and not issued by OSTP. Nevertheless, they were published with an Executive Office of the President seal and bore a White House OSTP copyright. The head of the agency ordered the documents withdrawn and terminated Legates from his OSTP position.
