= Robert Jastrow =

American astronomer (1925–2008)

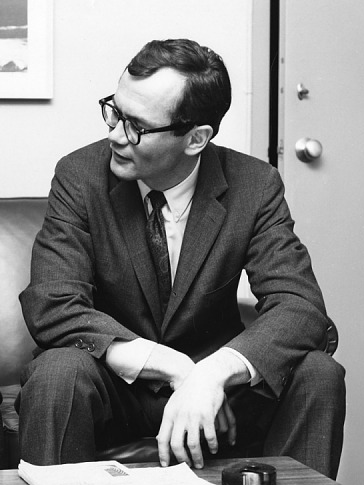
- Born: September 7, 1925; New York, U.S.
- Died: February 8, 2008 (aged 82); Arlington, Virginia
- Education: Columbia University
- Known for: Planetary science
- Scientific career
- Fields: Astronomy, Astrophysics
- Workplaces: Goddard Institute for Space Studies

Robert Jastrow (September 7, 1925 – February 8, 2008) was an American astronomer and planetary physicist. He was a NASA scientist, populist author and futurist.

== Education ==
Jastrow attended Townsend Harris High School. He also attended the summer program at Camp Rising Sun. He entered Columbia University for his undergraduate and graduate college, where he earned the BA, MA (1945), and PhD (1948) degrees in physics.

== Career ==
After leaving Columbia, Jastrow became an assistant professor at Yale, and then joined the Naval Research Laboratory. In 1958, he joined the newly formed National Aeronautics and Space Administration as head of its theoretical division. In 1961, he became the founding director of NASA's Goddard Institute for Space Studies and served as its director until his retirement from NASA in 1981. Concurrently, he was a professor of Geophysics at Columbia University.

Jastrow was the first chairman of NASA’s Lunar Exploration Committee, which established the scientific goals for the exploration of the Moon during the Apollo lunar landings.

Jastrow was a public figure, prolific author and commentator on a range of topics including the space program, astronomy, earth science, and national security issues. He lectured on CBS and NBC, and his book, Red Giants and White Dwarfs: The Evolution of Stars. was a bestseller

In 1981, Jastrow left NASA to join the faculty of Dartmouth College as professor of Earth Sciences. He left Dartmouth in 1992 to take up duties as director and chairman of the Mount Wilson Institute, managing the Mount Wilson Observatory in California. Jastrow was a member of the NASA Alumni Association. In 1984, Jastrow, together with Fred Seitz and William Nierenberg, founded the George C. Marshall Institute, an organization that assessed scientific issues affecting public policy in Washington, DC. The institute supported U. S. President Ronald Reagan's Strategic Defense Initiative ("Star Wars"), for example in Jastrow's 1985 "How to Make Nuclear Weapons Obsolete". He also became a prominent climate change denier. The George C. Marshall Institute opposed the scientific consensus on anthropogenic global warming. Jastrow acknowledged that Earth was experiencing a warming trend but claimed that the cause was likely to be natural variation. Jastrow served as Chairman Emeritus of the George C. Marshall Institute until his death.

== Religious views ==
In an interview with Christianity Today, Jastrow said "Astronomers now find they have painted themselves into a corner because they have proven, by their own methods, that the world began abruptly in an act of creation to which you can trace the seeds of every star, every planet, every living thing in this cosmos and on the earth. And they have found that all this happened as a product of forces they cannot hope to discover. That there are what I or anyone would call supernatural forces at work is now, I think, a scientifically proven fact."

In his book, God and The Astronomers he illustrated his position as: “For the scientist who has lived by his faith in the power of reason, the story ends like a bad dream. He has scaled the mountains of ignorance, he is about to conquer the highest peak; as he pulls himself over the final rock, he is greeted by a band of theologians who have been sitting there for centuries.”

In a 1995 panel discussion on the PBS show, Think Tank with Ben Wattenberg, Jastrow summed up his position on the apparent conflict between science and religion by saying

"It seems to me that underlying our discussion has been the key issue whether there is an overlap between the domains of science and theology. And my colleagues and I differ in some degree on that. I believe there is no overlap and these are dichotomous, completely different domains of thought."

== Awards ==
- NASA Medal for Exceptional Scientific Achievement, 1968
- Arthur S. Fleming Award for Outstanding Service in the U.S. Government, 1964
- Columbia University Medal of Excellence, 1962
- Columbia Graduate Facilities Award to Distinguished Alumni
- Doctor of Science degree (honorary) from Manhattan College

== Selected television appearances ==
- Hosted more than 100 CBS-TV network programs on space science
- Special guest of NBC-TV with Wernher von Braun for the Apollo–Soyuz flights
- Featured guest of the Today show on the 10th anniversary of the landing on the Moon

== Selected publications ==
=== Books ===
- Red Giants and White Dwarfs (1967), W. W. Norton & Company, 1990 3rd edition, paperback: ISBN 0-393-85004-8
- Astronomy: Fundamentals & Frontiers (1972) John Wiley & Sons, 1984 4th edition: ISBN 0-471-89700-0, 1990 5th edition: ISBN 0-471-82795-9
- Until the Sun Dies (1977), W. W. Norton & Company, ISBN 0-393-06415-8
- God And The Astronomers (1978), W. W. Norton & Company, 2000 2nd edition, paperback: ISBN 0-393-85006-4. The Big Bang theory and the argument from design. Second edition contains appendices with Roman Catholic and Jewish perspectives.
- The Enchanted Loom: Mind in the Universe (1981) Simon & Schuster hardcover: ISBN 0-671-43308-3, Touchstone 1983 paperback: ISBN 0-671-47068-X, Oxford Univ Press 1993 paperback: ISBN 88-435-3349-5. The evolution of life and the development of the human mind. The title is from the 1937–38 Gifford Lectures by Charles Sherrington: "It is as if the Milky Way entered upon some cosmic dance. Swiftly the head mass becomes an enchanted loom where millions of flashing shuttles weave a dissolving pattern, always a meaningful pattern though never an abiding one; a shifting harmony of subpatterns."
- How to Make Nuclear Weapons Obsolete (1985), Little, Brown and Company hardcover: ISBN 0-316-45828-7
- Journey to the Stars: Space Exploration—Tomorrow and Beyond (1990), Transworld Publishers, Ltd hardcover: ISBN 0-593-01908-3, Bantam paperback: ISBN 0-553-34909-0

=== Periodicals ===
- Various articles on astronomy and space for The New York Times, Reader's Digest, Foreign Affairs, Commentary Magazine, Atlantic Monthly, and Scientific American.

=== Maternal biography ===
- Marie Jastrow, Looking Back: The American Dream Through Immigrant Eyes, 1907–1918, (1986), W. W. Norton & Company, ISBN 0-393-02348-6

== See also ==
- Merchants of Doubt
