= Marc Morano =

American political activist

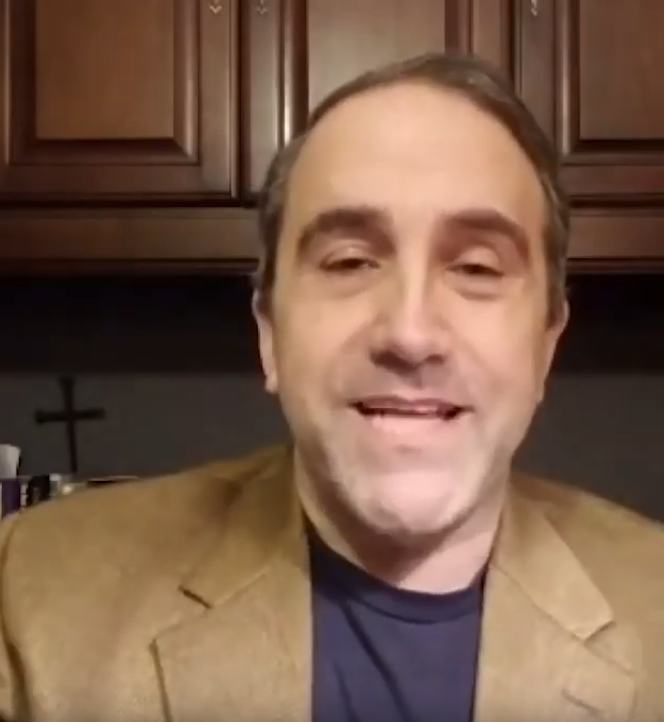
- Morano in 2019
- Born: 1968 (age 57–58)
- Citizenship: American
- Education: George Mason University (B.A.)
- Occupations: Former U.S. congressional staffer, founder and executive editor of ClimateDepot.org

Marc Morano (born 1968) is a former Republican political aide who founded and runs the website ClimateDepot.com. ClimateDepot is a project of the Committee for a Constructive Tomorrow (CFACT), a US non-profit organisation that promotes climate change denial.

== Career ==
Morano was born in Washington, D.C., and raised in McLean, Virginia. He has a bachelor's degree from George Mason University in political science.

He began his career working for Rush Limbaugh from 1992 to 1996. After 1996, he began working for Cybercast News Service (now CNSNews), where he was the first to publish the subsequently discredited accusations from Swift-Boat veterans that John Kerry had allegedly exaggerated his military service record.

Beginning in June 2006, Morano served as the director of communications for Senator Jim Inhofe. He was also communications director for the Senate Environment and Public Works Committee under the George W. Bush administration. In 2007, Morano produced a report listing hundreds of scientists whose work, according to Morano, questions whether global warming is caused by human activity.

In April 2009, despite having no formal education in the field of climate science, Morano founded and became executive editor of ClimateDepot.com, a website sponsored by the Committee for a Constructive Tomorrow (CFACT). In November 2009, Morano was one of the first to break the Climatic Research Unit email controversy story after being contacted by Anthony Watts. The story was subsequently picked up by James Delingpole. In 2016 Morano co-wrote and presented the CFACT-funded documentary Climate Hustle.

In December 2012, Morano debated Bill Nye on global warming on CNN's Piers Morgan Tonight. In January 2013, Morano debated Michael Brune, executive director of the Sierra Club, again on Piers Morgan Tonight. Morano was interviewed in the 2015 documentary Merchants of Doubt.

In 2019, Morano's blog described 16-year old climate change activist Greta Thunberg as an "autistic prophet", and he retweeted criticisms of her that center on her autism.

== Reception ==
Morano mocks scientists in television debates, which he describes as fun. In one blog post he wrote "We should kick scientists when they're down. They deserve to be publicly flogged", but then said "come on, it was a stupid expression." While some climatologists who felt they had been bullied were reluctant to give their names, Michael E. Mann openly said that Morano "spreads malicious lies about scientists, paints us as enemies of the people, then uses language that makes it sound like we should be subject to death threats, harmed or killed." Morano says he merely posts public contact details, and suggests to his followers that they say what they think to the scientists, who he says "live in a bubble" and don't hear from the public. He says this is refreshing, healthy, and "good for the public debate". At the end of 2012, left-leaning media watchdog Media Matters for America named Morano the "Climate Change Misinformer of the Year."

Morano has been criticized for publishing the email addresses of climate scientists on ClimateDepot.org. In March 2012, Morano posted an article and the email address of sociology professor Kari Norgaard, who had presented a paper on why it is difficult for societies to take action to respond to climate change. This story was later picked up by Rush Limbaugh, after which Norgaard received threatening emails. Morano repeated this action again in 2013, when he posted the email address of Shaun Marcott in response to Marcott's having published a temperature reconstruction which resembled the hockey stick graph.

Morano says that emails targeting climate scientists can be nasty in tone, but he defends the practice of posting their addresses by noting that he, too, has received hate mail. He says that his goal is to "let the professors hear from the public" and that receiving nasty emails is "part of the process".

In 2010, the conservative group Accuracy in Media awarded Morano their annual Reed Irvine Award alongside Andrew Breitbart. The lobbying group Doctors for Disaster Preparedness, described by The Guardian as a "fringe political group", awarded Morano the 2010 Petr Beckmann Award.
