= Hans von Storch =

German climate scientist

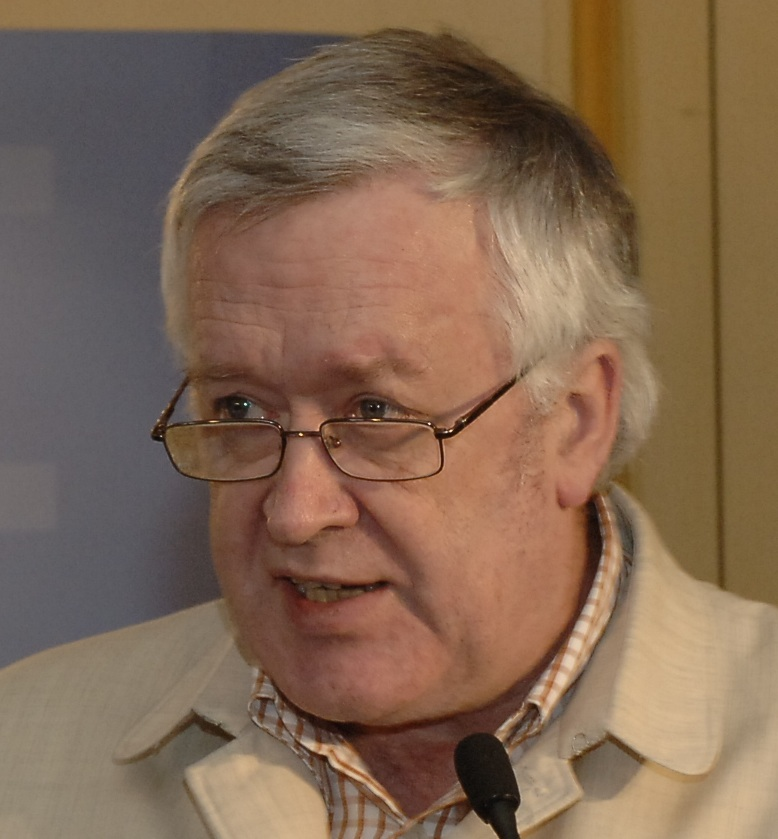
- Hans von Storch in February 2011
- Born: 13 August 1949 (age 77); Wyk auf Föhr, Germany
- Education: University of Hamburg
- Occupation: Climate scientist
- Years active: 1976–present
- Notable work: See below
- Board member of: Advisory boards: Journal of Climate
- Awards: Professor honoris causa, University of Gothenburg; International Meetings on Statistical Climatology Award

Hans von Storch (born 13 August 1949) is a German climate scientist. He is a professor at the Meteorological Institute of the University of Hamburg, and (since 2001) Director of the Institute for Coastal Research at the Helmholtz Research Centre (previously: GKSS Research Center) in Geesthacht, Germany. He is a member of the advisory boards of the journal Journal of Climate. He worked at the Max Planck Institute for Meteorology from 1986 to 1995 and headed the Statistical Analysis and Modelling research group there.

== Opinion on global warming ==
Storch said in testimony to the U.S. House of Representatives in 2006 that anthropogenic climate change exists:

"Based on the scientific evidence, I am convinced that we are facing anthropogenic climate change brought about by the emission of greenhouse gases into the atmosphere."

He is also known for an article in Der Spiegel he co-wrote with Nico Stehr, which states that:

"Scientific research faces a crisis because its public figures are overselling the issues to gain attention in a hotly contested market for newsworthy information."

"The alarmists think that climate change is something extremely dangerous, extremely bad and that overselling a little bit, if it serves a good purpose, is not that bad."

In December 2009, he expressed concern about the credibility of science and criticized some publicly visible scientists for simplifying and dramatizing their communications. He pointed to the German Waldsterben (Forest dieback) hype of the 1980s:

Research about the forest die back in Germany may serve as an example at the other end of the spectrum. The science of forest damages was in the 1980s heavily politicized, and used as support for a specific preconceived "good" policy of environmental protection. The resulting overselling and dramatization broke down in the 1990s, and news about adverse developments in German forests is now a hard sell in Germany. An observer wrote in 2004: "The damage for the scientists is enormous. Nobody believes them any longer." Of course, the damage was not only limited to the forest researchers, but also to other environmental scientists and politicians as well.

On 20 June 2013 Storch stated "So far, no one has been able to provide a compelling answer to why climate change seems to be taking a break. We're facing a puzzle. Recent CO_{2} emissions have actually risen even more steeply than we feared. As a result, according to most climate models, we should have seen temperatures rise by around 0.25 degrees Celsius (0.45 degrees Fahrenheit) over the past 10 years. That hasn't happened. In fact, the increase over the last 15 years was just 0.06 degrees Celsius (0.11 degrees Fahrenheit) -- a value very close to zero. This is a serious scientific problem that the Intergovernmental Panel on Climate Change (IPCC) will have to confront when it presents its next Assessment Report late next year."

== Climategate controversy ==
Hans von Storch, who also concurs with the mainstream view on global warming, said that the University of East Anglia (UEA) had "violated a fundamental principle of science" by refusing to share data with other researchers. "They play science as a power game," he said.

== Climate Research controversy ==
In 2003, with effect from 1 August, Hans von Storch was appointed as editor-in-chief of the journal Climate Research, after having been on its editorial board since 1994. A few months before a controversial article (Soon and Baliunas 2003) had raised questions about the journal's decentralised review process, with no editor-in-chief, and about the editorial policy of one editor, Chris de Freitas. Storch drafted and circulated an editorial on the new regime, reserving the right as editor-in-chief to reject articles proposed for acceptance by one of the editors. Following the publisher's refusal to publish the editorial unless all editors serving on the board endorsed the new policy, Storch resigned four days before he was due to take up his new position. Four other editors later left the journal. Storch later told the Chronicle of Higher Education that "climate science skeptics" “had identified Climate Research as a journal where some editors were not as rigorous in the review process as is otherwise common.”

== Publications and awards ==
In late 2004, Storch's team published an article in the journal Science which tested multiproxy methods such as those used by Mann, Bradley, and Hughes, 1998, often called MBH98, or Mann and Jones, to obtain the global temperature variations in the past 1000 years. The test suggested that the method used in MBH98 would inherently underestimate large variations had they occurred; but this was subsequently challenged: see hockey stick graph for more detail.

To reach this conclusion, Storch et al. used a climate model to generate a series of annual temperature maps for the world over the past several centuries. They then added white noise to the proxy data and applied the methods used in MBH98, a variation of principal component analysis, to the computed temperature maps and found that the amount of variation was considerably reduced.

In April 2006, Science published a comment authored by Wahl and collaborators, asserting errors in the 2004 paper, stating that "their conclusion was based on incorrect implementation of the reconstruction procedure" a mistake with Repercussions; and a disputing VS Reply. In this reply, VS and his team demonstrated that caveats raised in the Wahl comment did not invalidate their original conclusion. The inadequacy of the MBH98 methodology for climate reconstructions was later independently confirmed in other publications, for instance by Lee, Zwiers and Tsao, 2008 or by Christiansen et al., 2009.

In 2010, Storch received the IMSC achievement award at the International Meetings on Statistical Climatology in Edinburgh, to "recognize his key contributions to statistical downscaling, reconstruction of temperature series, analyses of climatic variability, and detection and attribution of climate change".

== Donald Duck ==
In 1977, Hans von Storch co-founded a 100-member Donald Duck Club, defending Donald Duck against accusations of indecent behavior. Between 1976 and 1985 he was publisher of a magazine on Donald Duck, Der Hamburger Donaldist.

== Selected publications ==
- —; Zorita, E.; Cubasch, U. (1993). "Downscaling of global climate change estimates to regional scales: An application to Iberian rainfall in wintertime" (PDF). Journal of Climate. 6 (6): 1161–71. Bibcode:1993JCli....6.1161V. doi:10.1175/1520-0442(1993)006<1161:DOGCCE>2.0.CO;2. hdl:21.11116/0000-0000-D54B-C. Archived from the original (PDF) on 2011-07-21.
- —; Zwiers, F.W. (1999). Statistical analysis in climate research. Cambridge University Press. ISBN 978-0-521-45071-3.
- —; Zorita, E.; Jones, J.M.; Dimitriev, Y.; Gonzalez-Rouco, F.; Tett, S.F.B. (October 2004). "Reconstructing past climate from noisy data" (PDF). Science. 306 (5696): 679–82. Bibcode:2004Sci...306..679V. doi:10.1126/science.1096109. PMID 15459344. S2CID 16329419.
- Brázdil, R.; Pfister, C.; Wanner, H.; —; Luterbacher, J. (2005). "Historical climatology in Europe — the state of the art" (PDF). Climatic Change. 70 (3): 363–430. Bibcode:2005ClCh...70..363B. CiteSeerX 10.1.1.367.6748. doi:10.1007/s10584-005-5924-1. S2CID 14713082. Archived from the original (PDF) on 2011-07-07.
