= Chris de Freitas =

New Zealand scientist (1948–2017)

- Born: 1948; Trinidad and Tobago
- Died: 5 July 2017 (aged 68–69); Zealand
- Education: University of Toronto, University of Queensland
- Scientific career
- Fields: Climatology
- Workplaces: University of Auckland
- Thesis: Beach climate and recreation : thermophysiological variation, preference and behaviour (1979)

Christopher Rhodes de Freitas (1948 – 5 July 2017) was a New Zealand climate scientist. He was an associate professor in the School of Environment at the University of Auckland.

== Education and professional career ==
De Freitas, born in Trinidad, received both his Bachelor's and his Master's at the University of Toronto, Canada, after which he earned his PhD as a Commonwealth Scholar from the University of Queensland, Australia. During his time at the University of Auckland, he served as deputy dean of science, head of science and technology, and for four years as pro vice-chancellor. He also served as vice-president of the Meteorological Society of New Zealand and was a founding member of the Australia–New Zealand Climate Forum as well as serving on the executive board of the International Society of Biometeorology from 1999 to 2001. He wrote extensively in popular media on an array of environmental and climate-related issues. In 2001, he won the New Zealand Association of Scientists' science communicator award, now known as the Cranwell Medal. He died of cancer in July 2017, having retired shortly beforehand.

== Global warming and scepticism about anthropogenic causes ==
De Freitas questioned anthropogenic global warming, and the way information is received and interpreted. He wrote that carbon dioxide emissions themselves may not necessarily be the source of recent increases in global temperature. In the New Zealand Herald (9 May 2006), he wrote:

"There is evidence of global warming. The climate has warmed about 0.6 °C in the past 100 years, but most of that warming occurred prior to 1940, before the post World War II industrialisation that led to an increase in carbon dioxide emissions. But warming does not confirm that carbon dioxide is causing it. Climate is always warming or cooling. There are natural variability theories of warming."

As an editor for the journal Climate Research he had responsibility for sending papers out for review. In four instances, questions were raised about the review process of papers he had handled. The last of these led to the Soon and Baliunas controversy, in which a flawed paper was published under his editorial responsibility. The publisher, Otto Kinne, subsequently conceded that the conclusions of the paper were not supported by the evidence, and appropriate revisions of the manuscript should have been requested prior to publication.

His only co-authored paper questioning anthropogenic climate change, Influence of the Southern Oscillation on tropospheric temperature, has been criticized for using flawed data.

== Selected publications ==
- Carter, R.M., de Freitas, C.R., Goklany, I.M., Holland, D. and Lindzen, R.S., 2007. Climate Science and the Stern Review. World Economics, 8 (2), 161–182.
- Khan, B.A., C.R. de Freitas and D. Shooter, 2007. Application of synoptic weather typing to an investigation of Nocturnal ozone concentration at a maritime location, New Zealand, Atmospheric Environment, 41, 5636–5646.
- Carter, R.M., de Freitas, C.R., Goklany, I.M., Holland, D. and Lindzen, R.S., 2006. The Stern Review: A Dual Critique. Part I: The Science. World Economics, 7 (4), 165–232.
- De Freitas, C.R., 2003: Tourism climatology: evaluating environmental information for decision making and business planning in the recreation and tourism sector. International Journal of Biometeorology, 48 (1), 45–54.
- De Freitas, C.R. and A.A. Schmekal, 2003: Condensation as a microclimate process: Measurement, numerical simulation and prediction in the Glowworm Tourist Cave, New Zealand. International Journal of Climatology, 23 (5), 557–575.
