= Copenhagen Climate Challenge =

During the United Nations Climate Change Conference 2009 (COP15), there was a rival conference in Copenhagen, Denmark, for deniers, called the Copenhagen Climate Challenge, which was organised by the Committee for a Constructive Tomorrow.

While COP15 attracted 33,200 delegates, the rival deniers' conference was attended by 60 people (15 journalists, 18 speakers, 27 audience). According to Lenore Taylor of The Australian, the attendees had an average age "well over 60". In closing his speech, Plimer stated that "They've got us outnumbered, but we've got them outgunned, and that's with the truth." Plimer also stated that "It's been freezing in Perth and bucketing down". Perth had below-average rainfall in 2009 and temperatures of 38 °C (100 °F) were forecast for 13 December.

== See also ==
- United Nations Climate Change Conference 2009
