= Energy & Environment =

- Discipline: Environment, climate change, energy economics, energy policy
- Language: English
- Edited by: Yiu Fai Tsang

Publication details
- History: 1989-present
- Publisher: SAGE Publishing
- Frequency: 8/year
- Impact factor: 2.945 (2020)

Standard abbreviations
- ISO 4: Energy Environ.

Indexing
- CODEN: EENVE2
- ISSN: 0958-305X
- LCCN: 2003210598
- OCLC no.: 21187549

Links
- Journal homepage; Online access

Energy & Environment is an academic journal "covering the direct and indirect environmental impacts of energy acquisition, transport, production and use". Under its editor-in-chief from 1998 to 2017, Sonja Boehmer-Christiansen, it was known for easygoing peer-review and publishing climate change denial papers. Yiu Fai Tsang became its editor-in-chief in May 2017.

== Abstracting and indexing ==
The journal is abstracted and indexed in the Social Sciences Citation Index, Scopus, EBSCO databases, Current Contents/Social & Behavioral Sciences, and Compendex. According to the Journal Citation Reports, the journal had a 2021 impact factor of 2.945, ranking it 65th out of 125 journals in the category "Environmental Studies".

== History ==
The journal was first published in 1989; David Everest (Department of the Environment, United Kingdom) was its founding editor. Following his death in 1998, Boehmer-Christiansen became the journal's editor. She and several members of the journal's editorial advisory board had previously been associated with "the Energy and Environment Groups" at the Science and Technology Policy Unit (University of Sussex), with John Surrey. Its publisher, Multi-science ceased trading on 31 December 2015 and the journal was transferred to SAGE. In May 2017, Yiu Fai Tsang became the journal's editor.

== Climate change denial and criticism ==
The journal was regarded as "a small journal that caters to climate change denialists". It has played an important role in attacking climate science and scientists, for example Michael E. Mann.

In 2011, a number of scientists such Gavin Schmidt, Roger A. Pielke Jr., Stephan Lewandowsky and Michael Ashley have criticised that E&E has low standards of peer review and little impact. In addition, Ralph Keeling criticized a paper in the journal which claimed that CO_{2} levels were above 400 ppm in 1825, 1857 and 1942, writing in a letter to the editor, "Is it really the intent of E&E to provide a forum for laundering pseudo-science?"

A 2005 article in Environmental Science & Technology stated that the journal is "obscure" and that "scientific claims made in Energy & Environment have little credibility among scientists." Boehmer-Christiansen acknowledged that the journal's "impact rating has remained too low for many ambitious young researchers to use it", but blamed this on "the negative attitudes of the Intergovernmental Panel on Climate Change (IPCC)/Climatic Research Unit people." According to Hans von Storch, the journal "tries to give people who do not have a platform a platform," which "is then attractive for skeptic papers. They know they can come through and that interested people make sure the paper enters the political realm."

When asked about the publication in the Spring of 2003 of a revised version of the paper at the center of the Soon and Baliunas controversy, Boehmer-Christiansen said, "I'm following my political agenda -- a bit, anyway. But isn't that the right of the editor?"

The journal has also been accused of publishing papers that could not have passed any reasonable peer review process, such as one in 2011 that claimed that the Sun was made of iron.

== See also ==
- Environmental engineering science
