= A History of Pi =

1970 book by Petr Beckmann

- Book cover of A History of Pi (3rd ed.)
- Author: Petr Beckmann
- Language: English
- Subject: Mathematics; General Sciences; History of mathematics
- Publisher: Golem Press (1st, 2nd ed.); St. Martin's Press (3rd ed.); Hippocrene Books (Reprint ed.)
- Publication date: 1970
- Publication place: United States
- Pages: 190 pages
- ISBN: 978-0-911762-07-5
- OCLC: 99082

A History of Pi (also titled A History of π) is a 1970 non-fiction book by Petr Beckmann that presents a layman's introduction to the concept of the mathematical constant pi (π).

== Author ==
Beckmann was a Czech who fled the Communist government of Czechoslovak to go to the United States. His dislike of authority gives A History of Pi a style that belies its dry title. For example, his chapter on the era following the classical age of ancient Greece is titled "The Roman Pest"; he calls the Catholic Inquisition the act of "insane religious fanatic"; and he says that people who question public spending on scientific research are "intellectual cripples who drivel about 'too much technology' because technology has wounded them with the ultimate insult: 'They can't understand it any more.'"

Beckmann was a prolific scientific author who wrote several electrical engineering textbooks and non-technical works, founded Golem Press, which published most of his books, and published his own monthly newsletter, Access to Energy. In his self-published book Einstein Plus Two and in Internet flame wars, he claimed that the theory of relativity is incorrect.

== Bibliography ==
A History of Pi was originally published as A History of π in 1970 by Golem Press. This edition did not cover any approximations of π calculated after 1946. A second edition, printed in 1971, added material on the calculation of π by electronic computers, but still contained historical and mathematical errors, such as an incorrect proof that there exist infinitely many prime numbers. A third edition was published as A History of Pi in 1976 by St. Martin's Press. It was published as A History of Pi by Hippocrene Books in 1990. The title is given as A History of Pi by both Amazon and by WorldCat.

1. Beckmann, Petr (1970), A History of π (1st ed.), Golem Press, p. 190, ISBN 0-911762-07-8
2. Beckmann, Petr (1971-01-01), A History of π (2nd ed.), Golem Press, p. 196, ISBN 0-911762-12-4
3. Beckmann, Petr (1976-07-15), A History of Pi (3rd ed.), St. Martin's Press, p. 208, ISBN 0-312-38185-9
4. Beckmann, Petr (1977), A History of π (4th ed.), Golem Press, p. 202, ISBN 0-911762-18-3
5. Beckmann, Petr (1982), A History of π (5th ed.), Golem Press, p. 202, ISBN 0-911762-18-3
6. Beckmann, Petr (1990-06-01), A History of Pi (Reprint ed.), Hippocrene Books, p. 200, ISBN 0-88029-418-3

== See also ==
- History of Pi
