= Center for the Study of Carbon Dioxide and Global Change =

Climate change denial organization

- Founded: 1998
- Type: 501(c)(3)
- Purpose: CO2 Science
- Location: Tempe, Arizona
- Key people: Sherwood B. Idso, President; Craig D. Idso, Chairman; Keith E. Idso, Vice-President
- Revenue: $1,001,003
- Website: www.co2science.org

The Center for the Study of Carbon Dioxide and Global Change is a 501(c)(3) non-profit organization based in Tempe, Arizona. It is seen as a front group for the fossil fuel industry, and as promoting climate change denial. The Center produces a weekly online newsletter called CO_{2}Science.

The Center was founded and is run by Craig D. Idso, along with Sherwood B. Idso, his father, and Keith E. Idso, his brother. They came from backgrounds in agriculture and climate. According to the Idsos, they became involved in the global warming controversy through their study of Earth's temperature sensitivity to radiative perturbations and plant responses to elevated CO_{2} levels and carbon sequestration. The Center sharply disputes the scientific consensus on climate change shown in IPCC assessment reports, and believes that global warming will be beneficial to mankind.

== Funding ==
According to IRS records, the ExxonMobil Foundation provided a grant of $15,000 to the center in 2000. Another report states that ExxonMobil has funded an additional $55,000 to the center. ExxonMobil stated it funded, "organizations which research significant policy issues and promote informed discussion on issues of direct relevance to the company. [...] These organizations do not speak on our behalf, nor do we control their views and messages."

The center was also funded by Peabody Energy, America’s biggest coalmining company.

== Reception ==
A December 2009 article in Mother Jones magazine said the Center was a promoter of climate disinformation, from a family prominent in promoting climate change denial.
