= Environmental and Experimental Botany =

- Discipline: Botany
- Language: English
- Edited by: Sergi Munné-Bosch

Publication details
- Former name(s): Radiation Botany
- History: 1961–present
- Publisher: Elsevier
- Frequency: Monthly
- Impact factor: 6.028 (2021)

Standard abbreviations
- ISO 4: Environ. Exp. Bot.

Indexing
- CODEN: EEBODM
- ISSN: 0098-8472

Links
- Journal homepage; Online access; Online archive

Environmental and Experimental Botany is a monthly peer-reviewed scientific journal in the field of botany. It was established in 1961 as Radiation Botany, obtaining its current name in 1976. It is published by Elsevier and the editor-in-chief is Sergi Munné-Bosch (University of Barcelona). According to the Journal Citation Reports, the journal has a 2021 impact factor of 6.028.
