= Climate Research (journal) =

- Discipline: Climatology
- Language: English
- Edited by: Mikhail Semenov, Nils Stenseth

Publication details
- History: 1990–present
- Publisher: Inter-Research Science Center
- Frequency: 9/year
- Impact factor: 1.972 (2020)

Standard abbreviations
- ISO 4: Clim. Res.

Indexing
- ISSN: 0936-577X (print); 1616-1572 (web)
- OCLC no.: 22630859

Links
- Journal homepage

Climate Research is a peer-reviewed scientific journal published by the Inter-Research Science Center and best known to the general public for its 2003 publication of a controversial paper. The journal was established in 1990 and covers all aspects of the interactions of climate with organisms, ecosystems, and human societies. Its founder and long time publisher was marine biologist Otto Kinne.

== Soon and Baliunas controversy ==
In 2003, a controversial paper written by Willie Soon and Sallie Baliunas was published in the journal after being accepted by editor Chris de Freitas. The article reviewed 240 previous papers and concluded that "Across the world, many records reveal that the 20th century is probably not the warmest or a uniquely extreme climatic period of the last millennium". Many of the scientists cited in the paper denied this conclusion and protested that their data and results had been misrepresented. In response to the handling by the journal publisher of the controversy over the paper's publication, several scientists, including newly appointed editor-in-chief Hans von Storch, resigned from the journal's editorial board. "While these statements may be true, the critics point out that they cannot be concluded convincingly from the evidence provided in the paper. CR should have requested appropriate revisions of the manuscript prior to publication."

== See also ==
- Global warming controversy
- List of earth and atmospheric sciences journals
