= William Kininmonth (meteorologist) =

Australian meteorologist

William Robert Kininmonth is an Australian retired meteorologist who rejects the scientific consensus on climate change.

== Education ==
Kininmonth has a B.Sc. from the University of Western Australia, a M.Sc. from Colorado State University, and a M.Admin. from Monash University.

== Career ==
Kininmonth headed Australia's National Climate Centre at the Bureau of Meteorology from 1986 to 1998. He was Australia's delegate to the WMO Commission for Climatology, was a member of Australia's delegations to the Second World Climate Conference (1990) and the subsequent intergovernmental negotiations for the Framework Convention on Climate Change (1991–1992). He has never published any climate change research, not even while he headed Australia's National Climate Centre at the Bureau of Meteorology.

Kininmonth published a book, Climate Change, a Natural Hazard in 2004.

The book launch for Kininmonth's Climate Change: a Natural Hazard was organised by the Lavoisier Group, of which Kininmonth and Ian Plimer are members, and was chaired by Hugh Morgan, the President of the Business Council of Australia.

Kininmonth is a science adviser to the Science and Public Policy Institute.

Kininmonth runs the Australasian Climate Research Institute (trading as Australasian Climate Research) from his home in Victoria (Australia).

== Articles ==
- "Unmasking “An Inconvenient Truth”, William Kininmonth, February 2007, Center for Science and Public Policy
