= William Nierenberg =

American physicist (1919–2000)

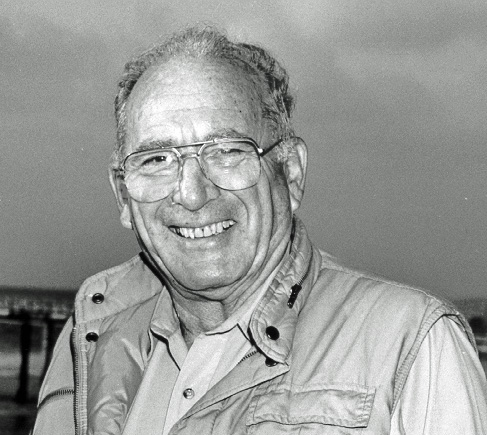
- Born: February 13, 1919; New York City, US
- Died: September 10, 2000 (aged 81)
- Education: Columbia University; City College of New York
- Scientific career
- Fields: Physics
- Workplaces: University of Michigan; University of California, Berkeley; Scripps Institution of Oceanography
- Thesis: The Radiofrequency Spectra of the Sodium Halides (1947)
- Doctoral advisor: Norman Ramsey

William Aaron Nierenberg (February 13, 1919 – September 10, 2000) was an American physicist who worked on the Manhattan Project and was director of the Scripps Institution of Oceanography from 1965 through 1986. He was a co-founder of the George C. Marshall Institute in 1984.

== Background ==
Nierenberg was born on February 13, 1919, at 213 E. 13th Street, on the Lower East Side of New York, the son of very poor Jewish immigrants from Austro-Hungary. He went to Townsend Harris High School and then the City College of New York (CCNY), where he won a scholarship to spend his junior year abroad in France at the University of Paris. In 1939, he became the first recipient of a William Lowell Putnam fellowship from the City College. Also in 1939, he participated in research at Columbia University, where he took a course in statistical mechanics from his future mentor, I. I. Rabi. He went on to graduate work at Columbia. Still, from 1941, he spent the war years seconded to the Manhattan Project, working on isotope separation, before returning to Columbia to complete his PhD.

== Career ==
In 1948, Nierenberg took up his first academic staff position, as Assistant Professor of Physics at the University of Michigan. From 1950 to 1965, he was Associate and then Professor of Physics at the University of California, Berkeley, where he had a very large and productive low energy nuclear physics laboratory, graduating 40 PhDs and publishing about 100 papers. He was responsible for determining more nuclear moments than any other individual. This work was cited when he was elected to the National Academy of Sciences in 1971.

In 1953, Nierenberg took a one-year leave to serve as the director of the Columbia University Hudson Laboratories, working on naval warfare problems. Later, he oversaw the design and construction of the “new” physics building at Berkeley. Much later (1960–1962), he took leave once again as Assistant Secretary General of the North Atlantic Treaty Organization (NATO) in charge of scientific affairs, overseeing many international studies on physics and advanced defense technologies.

In 1965, Nierenberg was asked to be the Scripps Institution of Oceanography (SIO) director. Nierenberg was the director of SIO for 21 years, the longest-serving director to date. Five modern research vessels joined the Scripps fleet during his tenure, and the institution’s budget increased fivefold. He oversaw the Deep Sea Drilling Project (1966–1986), which produced scientific advances such as the discovery of deep-sea hydrocarbons, the finding that the Mediterranean Sea had once been a closed basin and even a dry seabed, and confirmation that present ocean basins are young. The project became the first multi-institutional, international scientific collaboration and a model for later projects.

Nierenberg gained national recognition for his contributions to science. He was elected to the National Academy of Sciences in 1971 and the governing Council of the Academy in 1979. He was also elected to the American Academy of Arts and Sciences in 1965, the American Philosophical Society in 1975, and the National Academy of Engineering in 1983. In 1981, Nierenberg became a founding member of the World Cultural Council. In 1987, he was awarded the Delmer S. Fahrney Medal from the Franklin Institute for outstanding leadership in science.

== Advisory boards ==
Nierenberg served on many panels and advisory committees after returning from NATO. In 1971, he was appointed chairman of the National Academy of Sciences National Advisory Committee on Oceans and Atmosphere and served on this committee until 1977. He served on various panels of the President's Science Advisory Committee. He was a member of the National Science Board from 1972 to 1978 and was appointed for another term from November 1982 to May 1988.

Nierenberg was a consultant to the National Security Agency and served on many military-related panels. In 1976, he was appointed one of two senior consultants to the newly formed White House Office of Science and Technology Policy (OSTP). He was a member of the National Aeronautics and Space Administration’s (NASA) Advisory Council from 1978 to 1982 and was its first chairman. He was Chairman of the OSTP Acid Rain Peer Review Panel, whose report "Acid Rain" was published in 1984. The report encouraged the administration to curb acid rain emissions.

== Climate ==
Nierenberg took a strong interest in the problem of global warming. Under his predecessor at Scripps, Roger Revelle, Scripps had begun a program to monitor CO_{2} and other greenhouse gases. Nierenberg supported this work and intervened personally when research funds for the program were threatened.

In October 1980, during the Carter presidency, an Act of Congress was passed requesting the National Academy of Science to review what was known about climate change. The Academy appointed Nierenberg to chair the committee to produce this report. The committee comprised prominent physical scientists and two economists, William Nordhaus of Yale and Thomas Schelling of Harvard. Schelling and many scientists had served on committees for two previous reports for the Carter administration, highlighting global warming as a potentially major problem. Nordhaus was developing a new model for growth in CO_{2} emissions, the first which did not assume linear extrapolations.

The scientific facts of the resulting Changing Climate report, which was released in October 1983, were largely in line with the previous reports. Its key points were:

- The most probable date of CO_{2} "doubling" (to 600 ppm) was 2065 (page 21)
- Global warming due to doubling CO_{2} is likely between 1.5 – 4.5 °C, as suggested by the Charney report. Careful review of dissenting inferences suggesting negligible CO_{2}-induced climate change shows these to be based on misleading analysis (page 28)
- Warming at equilibrium would be 2-3 times as great over the polar regions as over the tropics, and probably greater over the arctic (page 30)
- The sea level might rise by 70 cm over a century due to thermal expansion and the melting of alpine glaciers. There was great uncertainty about the fate of the West Antarctic Ice Sheet; disintegration could lead to a sea-level rise of 5 to 6 m over several hundred years (page 42)

The report also contained policy recommendations:

- CO_{2} is a cause for concern, but not panic; a program of action without a program for learning would be costly and ineffective (page 61)
- A careful, well-designed program of monitoring and analysis is needed to detect the CO_{2} signal on climate (page 76)

The policy recommendations have proved controversial, and they have decelerated calls for quick action on climate change in the media and Washington. Historians Naomi Oreskes, Erik M. Conway, and Matthew Shindell have argued that Nierenberg's report marked the genesis of climate change debates that would ensue over the subsequent decades. Reagan administration science advisor George A. Keyworth II cited the report in arguing against “unwarranted and unnecessarily alarmist” conclusions of the Environmental Protection Agency. Exxon similarly cited the report in reversing previous commitments to renewable energy research. Oreskes and Conway contend that the chapters written by the economists differ from those written by the scientists, that the policy recommendations reflect mainly the views of the economists, and that Nierenberg, the committee chairman, personally rejected an emerging consensus view on global warming among climate scientists, and "in doing so arguably launched the climate change debate, transforming the issue from one of scientific concern to one of political controversy." In a 2010 paper, Nierenberg's son, Nicolas, disputes each of these points, arguing that the report's scientific conclusions reflected the current consensus and pointing out that other climate reports from the time also stopped short of recommending near-term energy-policy changes.

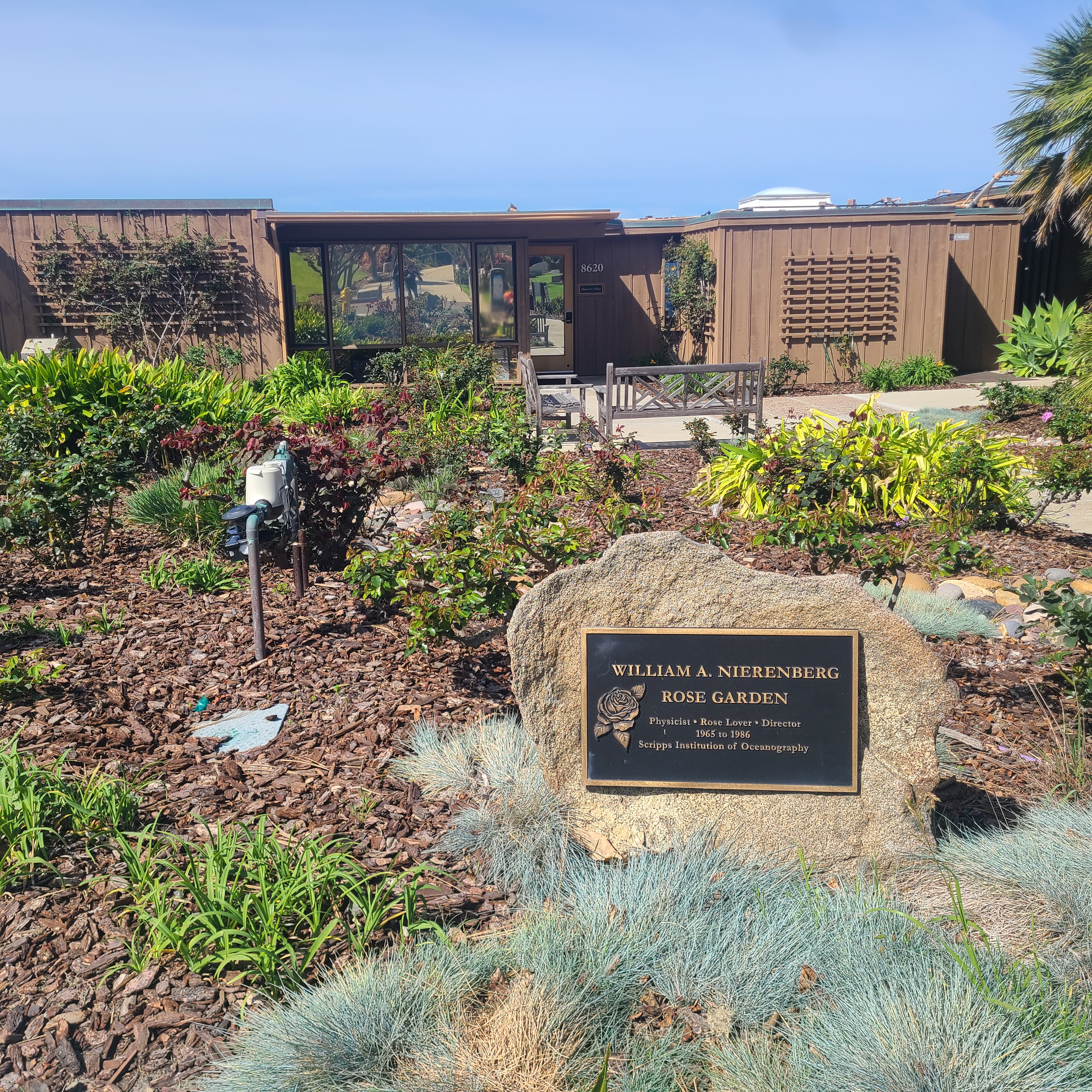
The William Nierenberg Rose Garden at the Scripps Institution of Oceanography, outside the Director's office, March 2024. The plaque reads: "Physicist. Rose lover. Director".

== Marshall Institute ==
Nierenberg subsequently became a co-founder of the George C. Marshall Institute.

== Legacy ==
A building and a rose garden on the Scripps Institution of Oceanography campus are named for him, and the Nierenberg Prize for Science in the Public Interest has been started. Some recipients have been E. O. Wilson, Walter Cronkite, Jane Lubchenco, David Attenborough, Jane Goodall, Craig Venter, Gordon Moore, James E. Hansen and Richard Dawkins.

== See also ==
- Merchants of Doubt
- Nierenberg Prize

== Notes ==
Government offices
Preceded by Roger Revelle	Director of Scripps Institution of Oceanography; 1965–1986	Succeeded by Edward A. Frieman
