= Agricultural and Forest Meteorology =

- Discipline: Meteorology, agriculture, forestry, natural ecosystems
- Language: English
- Edited by: Claudia Wagner-Riddle

Publication details
- History: 1964–present
- Publisher: Elsevier
- Frequency: Monthly
- Impact factor: 5.734 (2020)

Standard abbreviations
- ISO 4: Agric. For. Meteorol.

Indexing
- ISSN: 0168-1923
- OCLC no.: 243418822

Links
- Journal homepage; http://www.sciencedirect.com/science/journal/01681923

Agricultural and Forest Meteorology is a peer-reviewed scientific journal covering research on the relationships between meteorology and the fields of plant, animal, and soil sciences, ecology, and biogeochemistry. The editor-in-chief is Claudia Wagner-Riddle (University of Guelph).

According to the Journal Citation Reports, the journal has a 2020 impact factor of 5.734, ranking it 2nd out of 67 journals in the category "Forestry".
