= Science Bulletin =

Multidisciplinary scientific journal

- Discipline: Science
- Language: English, Chinese
- Edited by: George Fu Gao

Publication details
- Former name: Chinese Science Bulletin
- History: 1956-present
- Publisher: Elsevier (on behalf of Science China Magazine Press)
- Frequency: Semi-monthly
- Open access: Yes, since 2011
- License: copyright or Creative Commons by Attribution
- Impact factor: 20.7 (2025)

Standard abbreviations
- ISO 4: Sci. Bull. formerly: Chi. Sci. Bull.

Indexing
- ISSN: 2095-9273 (print); 2095-9281 (web)
- OCLC no.: 909881195

Links
- Journal homepage

Science Bulletin (shortened as Sci. Bull.) is a semi-monthly peer-reviewed international journal sponsored by the Chinese Academy of Sciences and the National Natural Science Foundation of China. Published by Elsevier on behalf of Science China Magazine Press, the journal focuses on "high-caliber peer-reviewed research in a broad range of natural sciences and high-tech fields on the basis of its originality, scientific significance and whether it is of general interest."

Since 2011, all of its articles have been published open access under the Creative Commons by Attribution license.
