= Committee for a Constructive Tomorrow =

U.S. non-profit organization

- Abbreviation: CFACT
- Formation: 1985
- Type: Nonprofit organization think tank
- Headquarters: Washington, DC, United States
- President: Craig Rucker
- Key people: Craig Rucker; Marc Morano; Duggan Flanakin; Christina Wilson Norman; Paul Driessen
- Revenue: $2,131,668 (2015)
- Expenses: $1,751,468 (2015)
- Website: www.cfact.org

The Committee for a Constructive Tomorrow (CFACT) is a US-based 501(c)(3) nonprofit organization founded in 1985 that advocates for free-market solutions to environmental issues. According to its mission statement, CFACT also seeks to protect private property rights, promote economic policies that reduce pollution and protect wildlife, and provide an "alternative voice on issues of environment and development".

The organization rejects the scientific consensus on climate change.

== Personnel and funding ==
CFACT is governed by a board of directors that includes founding president David Rothbard. Staffers include communications director Marc Morano and policy analyst Paul Driessen, the author of "Eco-Imperialism: Green Power, Black Death".

Total revenues over the years 2009 through 2011 have averaged around $3 million, as reported on the organization's IRS Form 990 and its 2011 annual audited financial statement. In 2010, nearly half of CFACT's funding came from Donors Trust, a nonprofit donor-advised fund with the goal of "safeguarding the intent of libertarian and conservative donors". In 2011, CFACT received a $1.2 million grant from Donors Trust, 40% of CFACT's revenue that year. Peabody Energy funded CFACT before its bankruptcy as did Robert E. Murray's Murray Energy before its bankruptcy.

== Advocacy activities ==
CFACT is a member organization of the Cooler Heads Coalition, which rejects climate science, is known to promote falsehoods about climate change and has been characterized as a leader in efforts to stop the government from addressing climate change. CFACT chapters have protested in defense of oil exploration and in opposition to the Kyoto Protocol. CFACT supports drilling for oil in the Arctic National Wildlife Refuge as well as hydraulic fracturing (fracking) in natural gas and oil-rich regions of the country.

=== Collegians for a Constructive Tomorrow ===
Collegians for a Constructive Tomorrow is a student-led branch of CFACT led by National Director Bill Gilles.

=== Climate Hustle documentary ===
The 2016 documentary film Climate Hustle, co-written and presented by Marc Morano of climate change denial group ClimateDepot, was produced by "CFACT Presents", with the organization's president and executive director, David Rothbard and Craig Rucker, receiving executive producer credits. Aired in around 400 theaters across the United States on May 2, 2016, the film mocks climate science through a series of interviews with climate change deniers as well as commentary by Morano. Ars Technica likened the film's style to a "Gish Gallop", calling it "a fast-paced, uninterrupted delivery of superficial and false claims about climate science" which forms "an 80-minute-long list of all the climate 'skeptic' blogosphere's favorite claims".

=== Copenhagen Climate Challenge 2009 ===
During the Climate COP15 conference in Copenhagen, CFACT hosted a rival event in Copenhagen called the Copenhagen Climate Challenge, which was attended by about 50 people. According to Lenore Taylor of The Australian, Professor Ian Plimer, "a star attraction of the two-day event", attracted an audience of 45.

=== CFACT Europe ===
CFACT Europe is CFACT's European branch. It was founded by German historian Holger Thuss who is also connected to the Heartland Institute. Thuss is also president of the climate change denial European Institute for Climate and Energy in Jena.

== See also ==
- Environmentalism
- Environmental movement
- Environmental policy of the United States
