= George C. Marshall Institute =

Former American nonprofit conservative think tank

- Motto: "Science for Better Public Policy"
- Founders: Frederick Seitz, Robert Jastrow, William Nierenberg
- Established: 1984; 42 years ago
- Focus: Energy, environmental, and defense policy
- Budget: Revenue: $309,750; Expenses: $1,086,309 (FYE October 2015)
- Location: Arlington, Virginia, United States
- Dissolved: August 2015

The George C. Marshall Institute (GMI) was a nonprofit conservative think tank in the United States. It was established in 1984 with a focus on science and public policy issues and had an initial focus in defense policy. Starting in the late 1980s, the institute advocated for views in line with environmental skepticism, most notably climate change denial. The think tank received extensive financial support from the fossil fuel industry.

Though the institute officially closed in 2015, the climate-denialist CO_{2} Coalition is viewed as its immediate successor. GMI's defense research was absorbed by the Center for Strategic and International Studies.

== History ==
The George C. Marshall Institute was founded in 1984 by Frederick Seitz (former President of the United States National Academy of Sciences), Robert Jastrow (founder of NASA's Goddard Institute for Space Studies), and William Nierenberg (former director of the Scripps Institution of Oceanography). The institute's primary aim, initially, was to play a role in defense policy debates, defending Ronald Reagan's Strategic Defense Initiative (SDI, or "Star Wars"). In particular, it sought to defend SDI "from attack by the Union of Concerned Scientists, and in particular by the equally prominent physicists Hans Bethe, Richard Garwin, and astronomer Carl Sagan." The institute argued that the Soviet Union was a military threat. A 1987 article by Jastrow argued that in five years the Soviet Union would be so powerful that it would be able to achieve world domination without firing a shot. When the Cold War instead ended in the 1991 collapse of the Soviet Union, the institute shifted from an emphasis on defense to a focus on environmental skepticism, including global warming denial.

The institute's shift to environmental skepticism began with the publication of a report on global warming by William Nierenberg. During the 1988 United States presidential election, George H. W. Bush had pledged to meet the "greenhouse effect with the White House effect." Nierenberg's report, which blamed global warming on solar activity, had a large impact on the incoming Bush presidency, strengthening those in it opposed to environmental regulation. In 1990 the institute's founders (Jastrow, Nierenberg and Seitz) published a book on climate change. The appointment of David Allan Bromley as presidential science advisor, however, saw Bush sign the United Nations Framework Convention on Climate Change in 1992, despite some opposition from within his administration.

In 1994, the institute published a paper by its then chairman, Frederick Seitz, titled Global warming and ozone hole controversies: A challenge to scientific judgment. Seitz questioned the view that CFCs "are the greatest threat to the ozone layer". In the same paper, commenting on the dangers of secondary inhalation of tobacco smoke, he concluded "there is no good scientific evidence that passive inhalation is truly dangerous under normal circumstances."

In 2012, the institute took over the responsibility for running the Missilethreat.com website from the Claremont Institute. Missilethreat.com aims to inform the American people of missile threats, thereby encouraging the deployment of a ballistic missile defense system. Since the closure of the institute, the Missilethreat.com website has been maintained by the Center for Strategic and International Studies.

== Publications ==
Politicizing Science: The Alchemy of Policymaking is a book by the George C. Marshall Institute, edited by Michael Gough. The book, published in 2003, encourages a disinterested objectivity on the part of scientists and policymakers: Ideally, the scientists or analysts who generate estimates of harm that may result from a risk would consider all the relevant facts and alternative interpretations of the data, and remain skeptical about tentative conclusions. Ideally, too, the agency officials and politicians, who have to enact a regulatory program, would consider its costs and benefits, ensure that it will do more good than harm, and remain open to options to stop or change the regulation in situations where the underlying science is tentative.

== Global warming ==
Starting in 1989 GMI was involved in what it terms "a critical examination of the scientific basis for global climate change policy." This was described by Sharon Begley as a "central cog in the denial machine" in a 2007 Newsweek cover story on climate change denial.

In Requiem for a Species, Clive Hamilton is critical of the Marshall Institute and contends that the conservative backlash against global warming research was led by three prominent physicists—Frederick Seitz, Robert Jastrow, and William Nierenberg, who founded the institute in 1984. According to Hamilton, by the 1990s the Marshall Institute's main activity was attacking climate science. Naomi Oreskes and Erik M. Conway reach a similar conclusion in Merchants of Doubt (2010), where they identified a few contrarian scientists associated with conservative think-tanks who fought the scientific consensus and spread confusion and doubt about global warming. The book Climate Change: An Encyclopedia of Science and History, noting that GMI received funding from the automobile and fossil fuel industries and espouses "a mix of conservative, neoliberal, and libertarian ideological positions", states that GMI has "supported authors opposed to the hypothesis of anthropogenic warming and proposed mitigation policies ... stressing the free-market and the dangers of government regulation, which they said would hurt the US economy."

GMI was one of only a few conservative environmental-policy think tanks to have natural scientists on staff. Noted climate change deniers Sallie Baliunas and (until his death in 2008) Frederick Seitz (a past president of the National Academy of Sciences from 1962 to 1969) served on its board of directors. Patrick Michaels was a visiting scientist and Stephen McIntyre, Willie Soon and Ross McKitrick were contributing writers. Richard Lindzen served on the institute's Science Advisory Board.

In February 2005 GMI co-sponsored a congressional briefing at which Senator James Inhofe praised Michael Crichton's novel State of Fear and attacked the "hockey stick graph".

William O'Keefe, chief executive officer of the Marshall Institute, questioned the methods used by advocates of new government restrictions to combat global warming: "We have never said that global warming isn't real. No self-respecting think tank would accept money to support preconceived notions. We make sure what we are saying is both scientifically and analytically defensible."

=== Accusation of conflict of interest ===
Matthew B. Crawford was appointed executive director of GMI in September 2001. He left the GMI after five months, saying that the institute was "fonder of some facts than others". He contended a conflict of interest existed in the funding of the institute. In Shop Class as Soulcraft, he wrote about the institute that "the trappings of scholarship were used to put a scientific cover on positions arrived at otherwise. These positions served various interests, ideological or material. For example, part of my job consisted of making arguments about global warming that just happened to coincide with the positions taken by the oil companies that funded the think tank."

In 1998 Jeffrey Salmon, then executive director of GMI, helped develop the American Petroleum Institute's strategy of stressing the uncertainty of climate science.

Naomi Oreskes states that the institute, in order to resist and delay regulation, lobbied politically to create a false public perception of scientific uncertainty over the negative effects of second-hand smoke, the carcinogenic nature of tobacco smoking, the existence of acid rain, and on the evidence connecting CFCs and ozone depletion.

== Funding sources ==
Exxon-Mobil was a funder of the GMI until it pulled funding from it and several similar organizations in 2008. From 1998 to 2008, the institute received a total of $715,000 in funding from Exxon-Mobil.

== See also ==
- Americans for Prosperity
- Cato Institute
- The Heartland Institute
- Manhattan Institute
