= Sallie Baliunas =

American astronomer

Sallie L. Baliunas
- Born: February 23, 1953 (age 73); New York City, United States
- Education: Villanova University, Harvard University
- Awards: Bok Prize (1988), Newton Lacy Pierce Prize in Astronomy (1988)
- Scientific career
- Fields: Astrophysics
- Workplaces: Mount Wilson Observatory, Center for Astrophysics | Harvard & Smithsonian
- Thesis: Optical and ultraviolet studies of stellar chromospheres of Lambda Andromedae and other late-type stars (1980)
- Doctoral advisor: Andrea Dupree

Sallie Louise Baliunas (born February 23, 1953) is a retired astrophysicist. She formerly worked at the Center for Astrophysics | Harvard & Smithsonian and was the Deputy Director of the Mount Wilson Observatory from 1991 to 2003.

== Early life and education ==
Baliunas was born and grew up in New York City and its suburbs. She attended public schools in the New York City area and high school in New Jersey. She received a BS in astrophysics from Villanova University in 1974, and an AM and a PhD in astrophysics from Harvard University in 1975 and 1980. Her doctoral thesis was titled, Optical and ultraviolet studies of stellar chromospheres of Lambda Andromedae and other late-type stars.

== Career ==
Baliunas was a research associate of the Harvard College Observatory in 1980 and became an astrophysicist in the Smithsonian Astrophysical Observatory at the Center for Astrophysics | Harvard & Smithsonian in 1989.

Baliunas was also a visiting scholar at Dartmouth College, an adjunct professor at Tennessee State University, and was deputy director of the Mount Wilson Observatory from 1991 to 2003.

She has been a member of the American Astronomical Society, American Geophysical Union, American Physical Society, Astronomical Society of the Pacific, International Astronomical Union, and Sigma XI.

She served on both the scientific advisory board and the board of directors of the Marshall Institute, a now defunct conservative think tank.

== Astrophysics ==
Baliunas's main focus was initially on astrophysical research. She studied visible and ultraviolet spectroscopy of stars; structure, variations, and activity in cool stars; evolution of stellar angular momentum; solar variability and global change; adaptive optics; exoplanets of Sun-like stars. She has published little in recent years, with only two refereed astronomy papers since 2010.

== Global warming and solar variability ==
In 1992, Baliunas was third author on a Nature paper that used observed variations in sun-like stars as an analogue of possible past variations in the Sun. The paper says that

"the sun is in an unusually steady phase compared to similar stars, which means that reconstructing the past historical brightness record may be more risky than has been generally thought".

By 1995, she had entered the global warming controversy. In January of that year the Marshall Institute think tank published a review she had written for them, "Are Human Activities Causing Global Warming?" disputing the IPCC Second Assessment Report and arguing that "predictions of an anthropogenic global warming have been greatly exaggerated, and that the human contribution to global warming over the course of the 21st century will be less than one degree Celsius and probably only a few tenths of a degree." She concluded with the view that "even if fears of anthropogenic global warming were realized – a concern which finds no support in the scientific data – there is no significant penalty for waiting at least two decades before taking corrective action to reduce global CO_{2} emissions." The work of Willie Soon and Baliunas, suggesting that solar variability is more strongly correlated with variations in air temperature than any other factor, even carbon dioxide levels, has been widely publicized by lobby groups including the Marshall Institute and Tech Central Station, and mentioned in the popular press. Baliunas and Soon became well known for climate change denial, and in 1997 she won the Petr Beckmann Award for her "devastating critique of the global warming hoax."

In regard to there being a connection between CO_{2} rise and climate change, she said in a 2001 essay with Willie Soon:

But is it possible that the particular temperature increase observed in the last 100 years is the result of carbon dioxide produced by human activities? The scientific evidence clearly indicates that this is not the case... measurements of atmospheric temperatures made by instruments lofted in satellites and balloons show that no warming has occurred in the atmosphere in the last 50 years. This is just the period in which humanmade carbon dioxide has been pouring into the atmosphere and according to the climate studies, the resultant atmospheric warming should be clearly evident.

The claim that atmospheric data showed no warming trend was incorrect, as the published satellite and balloon data at that time already showed a warming trend (see satellite temperature record). In later statements Baliunas acknowledged the measured warming in the satellite and balloon records, though she disputed that the observed warming reflected human influence.

Baliunas contends that findings of human influence on climate change are motivated by financial considerations: "If scientists and researchers were coming out releasing reports that global warming has little to do with man, and most to do with just how the planet works, there wouldn't be as much money to study it." She does not address the countervailing financial considerations of the energy companies that fund some of her collaborators, including Willie Soon who received over $1 million from petroleum and coal interests since 2001.

=== Controversy over the 2003 Climate Research paper ===
In 2003, Baliunas and aerospace engineer Willie Soon published a review paper on historical climatology in Climate Research, which concluded that "the 20th century is probably not the warmest nor a uniquely extreme climatic period of the last millennium." With Soon, Baliunas investigated the correlation between solar variability and temperatures of the Earth's atmosphere. When there are more sunspots, the total solar output increases, and when there are fewer sunspots, it decreases. Soon and Baliunas attribute the Medieval warm period to such an increase in solar output, and believe that decreases in solar output led to the Little Ice Age, a period of cooling from which the earth has been recovering since 1890.

The circumstances of the paper's publication were controversial, prompting concerns about the publishers' peer review process. An editorial revolt within Climate Research followed, with half of the journal's ten editors eventually resigning. The publisher subsequently stated that critics said that the conclusions of the paper "cannot be concluded convincingly from the evidence provided" and that the journal "should have requested appropriate revisions prior to publication."

== Ozone depletion ==
In 1995, Baliunas testified before the United States House Science Subcommittee on Energy and Environment that CFCs were not responsible for ozone depletion. An article written by Baliunas and Soon in 2000 for the Heartland Institute, a conservative and libertarian public policy think tank, promoted the idea that ozone depletion rather than CO_{2} emissions could explain atmospheric warming.

== Awards and honors ==
- 1977-1979 - Amelia Earhart Fellowship, Zonta International
- 1979 - Donald E. Billings Award in Astro-Geophysics, University of Colorado
- 1980-1985 - Langley Abbot Fellowship, Smithsonian Institution
- 1987 - Alumni Medallion Award, Villanova University
- 1988 - Bok Prize, Harvard University
- 1988 - Newton Lacy Pierce Prize in Astronomy, American Astronomical Society
- 1991 - One of America's outstanding women scientists, Discover magazine
- 1993-1994 - Wesson Fellow, Stanford University
- 1997 - Petr Beckmann Award, Doctors for Disaster Preparedness
