= Otto Kinne =

German marine biologist (1923–2015)

Otto Kinne (30 August 1923 – 3 March 2015) was a German marine biologist. He was director of Germany's Biologische Anstalt Helgoland from 1962 to 1984. Beginning From 1967 he was a professor at the University of Kiel. He established the Inter-Research Science Center (IRSC) in 1979 and is its director, and the International Ecology Institute in 1984, of which he was the president. The IRSC publishes eight international journals of which Kinne is the founder, including Marine Ecology Progress Series and Climate Research. He established the Otto Kinne Foundation in 1992 to provide grants to ecologists in Russia and Eastern Europe.
