= Petr Beckmann =

Physicist and nuclear power advocate (1924–1993)

- Born: November 13, 1924; Prague, Czechoslovakia
- Died: August 3, 1993 (aged 68); Boulder, Colorado, U.S.
- Education: Czech Academy of Sciences
- Known for: Libertarianism; Advocate of nuclear power Criticism of relativity theory Criticism of modern physics
- Scientific career
- Fields: Electrical engineering
- Workplaces: University of Colorado

Petr Beckmann (November 13, 1924 – August 3, 1993) was a professor of electrical engineering and advocate of libertarianism and nuclear power who disputed Albert Einstein's theory of relativity and other accepted theories in modern physics.

== Biography ==
In 1939, when Beckmann was 14, his family fled their home in Prague, Czechoslovakia to escape the Nazis. From 1942 to 1945, he served in a Czech squadron of the Royal Air Force. He worked as a radar mechanic on the newly invented radar systems that helped Britain win the Battle of the Atlantic. He received a B.Sc. in 1949, a Ph.D. in 1955, and a D.Sc. in 1962, all from Prague's Czech Academy of Sciences in electrical engineering. He defected to the United States in 1963 and became a professor (later, emeritus) of electrical engineering at the University of Colorado. In the United States, he became acquainted with novelist Ayn Rand, a contributing editor to a publication devoted to her ideas, The Intellectual Activist, and a speaker at The Thomas Jefferson School, an intellectual conference of similar purpose.

Beckmann was a prolific author; he wrote several electrical engineering textbooks and non-technical works. By 1968, he had founded Golem Press, which published most of his books. The Golem Press books included The Health Hazards of Not Going Nuclear (1976), which argued in favor of nuclear power during the height of the anti-nuclear movement by making "apples-to-apples" comparisons of the risks of nuclear power with the risks in the same terms (e.g., deaths per terawatt hour) of the alternative power sources. Beckmann also wrote A History of π, documenting the history of the calculation of π. The book also expresses opposition to the Roman culture, Catholicism (and other religions), Nazism, and Communism. He published his own monthly newsletter, Access to Energy, which since September 1993 has been written by biochemist Arthur B. Robinson.

In 1981, he took early retirement with emeritus status, in order to devote himself fully to what he saw as the defense of science, technology and free enterprise, through his newsletter, Access to Energy. He founded the Golem Press in 1967, publishing more than nine books. These included The History of π, Einstein Plus Two, and The Health Hazards of Not Going Nuclear (with an Introduction by Edward Teller). He wrote some 60 scientific papers and eight technical books. Beckmann spoke at the 1990 San Francisco Conference of International Society for Individual Liberty (ISIL), where he received a standing ovation for his speech in which he attacked "sham environmentalists".

Beckmann was also a frequent participant in Usenet debates. In them, he claimed to have debunked Albert Einstein's theory of special relativity in his book Einstein Plus Two, as well as in the journal Galilean Electrodynamics, which he also founded.

== Books ==
- Probability in Communication Engineering. New York: Harcourt, Brace & World. 1967. OCLC 565718.
- Elements of Applied Probability Theory. New York: Harcourt, Brace & World. 1968.
- Depolarization of Electromagnetic Waves. Boulder, CO: Golem Press. 1968. ISBN 99957-1-158-3.
- Whispered Anecdotes: Humor from Behind the Iron Curtain. Boulder, CO: Golem Press. 1969. ISBN 0-911762-04-3.
- A History of π. Boulder, CO: Golem Press. 1971. ISBN 0-911762-12-4.
- The Structure of Language: A New Approach. Boulder, CO: Golem Press. 1972. ISBN 0-911762-13-2.
- Eco-hysterics & the Technophobes. Boulder, CO: Golem Press. 1973. ISBN 0-911762-15-9.
- Orthogonal Polynomials for Engineers and Physicists. Boulder, CO: Golem Press. 1973. ISBN 0-911762-14-0.
- Elementary Queuing Theory and Telephone Traffic. New York: Flatiron Pub. 1976. ISBN 0-686-98072-7.
- The Health Hazards of Not Going Nuclear. Boulder, CO: Golem Press. 1977. ISBN 0-911762-17-5.
- Hammer and Tickle: Clandestine Laughter in the Soviet Empire. Boulder, CO: Golem Press. 1980. ISBN 0-911762-20-5.
- Einstein Plus Two. Boulder, CO: Golem Press. 1987. ISBN 978-0-911762-39-6.
- Scattering of Electromagnetic Waves from Rough Surfaces. New York: Artech House Publishers. 1987. ISBN 0-89006-238-2. (with coauthor A. Spizzichino)
- Musical Musings. Boulder, CO: Golem Press. 1989. ISBN 978-0-911762-40-2.

== See also ==
- Criticism of the theory of relativity
- List of Soviet and Eastern Bloc defectors
