= Nongovernmental International Panel on Climate Change =

Nongovernmental International Panel on Climate Change (NIPCC)
- Founder: S. Fred Singer
- Established: 2003; 23 years ago
- Website: climatechangereconsidered.org

The Nongovernmental International Panel on Climate Change (NIPCC) is an advocacy organisation set up by S. Fred Singer's Science & Environmental Policy Project, and later supported by the Heartland Institute lobbying group, in opposition to the assessment reports of the Intergovernmental Panel on Climate Change (IPCC) on the issue of global warming.

The NIPCC presents itself as an "international panel of nongovernment scientists and scholars who have come together to present a comprehensive, authoritative, and realistic assessment of the science and economics of global warming". Because it is not a government agency, and because its members are predisposed to dispute that climate change is caused by human greenhouse gas emissions, NIPCC claims to offer an independent “second opinion” of the evidence reviewed – or not reviewed – by the IPCC. The scientific validity of the claims made by the NIPCC report have been heavily criticized, as has the methodology of their reports and the lack of expertise of many of their authors.

== History ==
NIPCC states that their purpose is to objectively analyze and interpret data and facts without conforming to any specific agenda. They intend their organizational structure and purpose to stand in contrast to those of the United Nations’s Intergovernmental Panel on Climate Change (IPCC), which they contend is government-sponsored, politically motivated, and predisposed to believing that climate change is a problem in need of a U.N. solution.

NIPCC traces its beginnings to an informal meeting held in Milan, Italy, in 2003, organized by S. Fred Singer and the Science & Environmental Policy Project (SEPP). The purpose was to produce an independent evaluation of the available scientific evidence on the subject of carbon dioxide-induced global warming in anticipation of the release of the IPCC’s Fourth Assessment Report (AR4). NIPCC scientists concluded the IPCC was biased with respect to making future projections of climate change, discerning a significant human-induced influence on current and past climatic trends, and evaluating the impacts of potential carbon dioxide-induced environmental changes on Earth’s biosphere.

To highlight such perceived deficiencies in the IPCC’s AR4, in 2008, SEPP partnered with the Heartland Institute to produce “Nature, Not Human Activity, Rules the Climate”, a summary of research for policymakers that has been widely distributed and translated into six languages. In 2009, the Center for the Study of Carbon Dioxide and Global Change joined the original two sponsors to help produce Climate Change Reconsidered: The 2009 Report of the Nongovernmental International Panel on Climate Change (NIPCC) as an alternative to the reports of the IPCC.

In 2011, the three sponsoring organizations produced Climate Change Reconsidered: The 2011 Interim Report of the Nongovernmental International Panel on Climate Change (NIPCC), a review and analysis of new research released since the 2009 report or overlooked by the authors of that report.

In 2013, the Information Center for Global Change Studies, a division of the Chinese Academy of Sciences, translated and published an abridged edition of the 2009 and 2011 NIPCC reports in a single volume. On June 15, the Chinese Academy of Sciences organized a NIPCC Workshop in Beijing to allow the NIPCC principal authors to present summaries of their conclusions.

In September 2013, NIPCC released Climate Change Reconsidered II: Physical Science, the first of three volumes expanding and bringing up-to-date the original 2009 report as well as offering a counterpoint to the Intergovernmental Panel on Climate Change’s Fifth Assessment Report.

In 2014, the second volume of Climate Change Reconsidered II, subtitled "Biological Impacts", was published. It offered more than 1,000 pages of reviews of scientific research finding the impact of man-made global warming is benign and even beneficial to mankind and the natural world.

In November, 2015, the three lead NIPCC authors – Craig Idso, Robert M. Carter, and S. Fred Singer – wrote a small book titled Why Scientists Disagree About Global Warming: The NIPCC Report on Scientific Consensus stating that no survey or study shows a consensus on important scientific issues in the climate change debate, and that most scientists do not support the claims of the Intergovernmental Panel on Climate Change.

From March through June 2017, the Heartland Institute mailed 300,000 copies of the second edition of this book to K-12 and college science teachers across America.

== Publications ==
In April 2008, Singer’s Science and Environmental Policy Project (SEPP) and The Heartland Institute partnered to produce "Nature, Not Human Activity, Rules the Climate", subtitled “Summary for Policymakers of the Report of the Nongovernmental International Panel on Climate Change.” The 48-page report listed 24 contributors from 14 countries and included a foreword by Frederick Seitz, one of the world’s most renowned scientists. (Seitz died on March 2, 2008.) It was released at Heartland’s First International Conference on Climate Change (ICCC-1) on March 2–4, 2008.

In 2008, Singer conducted an extensive international tour to promote the new report. He spoke at events in the Netherlands (June 3–4), Brussels-EU (June 5), Germany (June 6–12), Vienna, Milan, Paris (June 19–20), and London (June 22–25). Local free-market think tanks arranged those events. Heartland distributed approximately 100,000 copies of Nature, Not Human Activity, Rules the Climate in 2008, and the booklet has been translated into French, German, Italian, and Spanish.

In the tradition of the IPCC, NIPCC had published its "Summary for Policymakers" in advance of completing the underlying report. The first full report, produced with a new partner, the Center for the Study of Global Warming and Global Change, was released in 2009. It was titled "Climate Change Reconsidered: The Report of the Nongovernmental International Panel on Climate Change (NIPCC)".

In 2011, NIPCC produced its third report, "Climate Change Reconsidered: The 2011 Interim Report". The volume summarized new research produced after the deadline for inclusion in the 2009 report as well as some research that had been overlooked when the first volume was produced.

In September 2013, NIPCC released Climate Change Reconsidered II: Physical Science, the first of three volumes expanding and bringing up-to-date the original 2009 report as well as offering a counter-point to the Intergovernmental Panel on Climate Change’s Fifth Assessment Report. Also in 2013, four NIPCC scientists produced a Scientific Critique of IPCC’s 2013 "Summary for Policymakers".

In 2014, the second volume of Climate Change Reconsidered II, subtitled "Biological Impacts", was published. It offered more than 1,000 pages of reviews of scientific research finding the impact of man-made global warming is benign and even beneficial to mankind and the natural world. Also in 2014, a team of climate scientists led by Robert M. Carter, a NIPCC lead author, produced a Commentary and Analysis on the Whitehead & Associates 2014 NSW Sea-Level Report, finding the Whitehead report does not provide reliable guidance to the complicated issues of measuring, forecasting, and responding to sea-level rise.

In November, 2015, NIPCC released Why Scientists Disagree About Global Warming: The NIPCC Report on Scientific Consensus. The three lead NIPCC authors – Craig Idso, Robert M. Carter, and S. Fred Singer – reveal how no survey or study shows a “consensus” on the most important scientific issues in the climate change debate, and how most scientists do not support the alarmist claims of the Intergovernmental Panel on Climate Change. This short book is a preliminary version of Chapter 2 of the forthcoming and final volume in the Climate Change Reconsidered II series, to be subtitled "Benefits and Costs of Fossil Fuels" which was published in 2017.

== Organization ==
NIPCC is a project of three independent nonprofit organizations: Science and Environmental Policy Project (SEPP), Center for the Study of Carbon Dioxide and Global Change (CO2 Science), and The Heartland Institute. Contributions to all three organizations help support the project.

S. Fred Singer, the founder of NIPCC, acts as chairman and ambassador of the group, despite being dead. As a retired professor of environmental science, he travels the world meeting with fellow scientists, discussing NIPCC’s research, and recruiting new members to the group.

Craig D. Idso, founder and chairman of the Center for the Study of Carbon Dioxide and Global Change, leads the research and writing effort for NIPCC publications. He hosts the CO2Science.org website featuring reviews of new research that will be edited for inclusion in the next edition of Climate Change Reconsidered, and works with an international team of authors, editors, contributors, and reviewers.

Joseph L. Bast, president of The Heartland Institute, leads the publication and promotional efforts of NIPCC. He and Heartland’s staff edit and produce NIPCC books, host the events at which the reports are released, and market the project’s efforts.

== See also ==
- Intergovernmental Panel on Climate Change
