= James Delingpole =

English writer (born 1965)

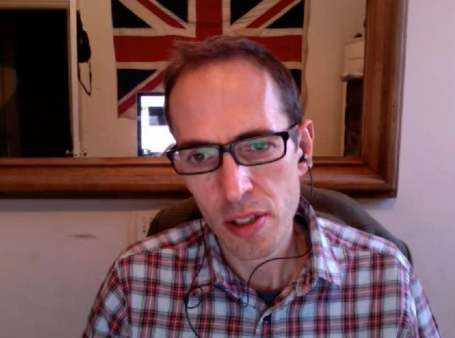
- Delingpole in 2012
- Born: James Mark Court Delingpole; 6 August 1965 (age 61); Alvechurch, Worcestershire, England
- Education: Malvern College; Christ Church, Oxford (BA)
- Occupations: Journalist columnist novelist
- Organization: Breitbart News
- Movement: Libertarian conservatism
- Website: www.jamesdelingpole.co.uk

James Mark Court Delingpole (born 6 August 1965) is an English writer, journalist, and columnist who has written for a number of publications, including the Daily Mail, the Daily Express, The Times, The Daily Telegraph, and The Spectator. He is a former executive editor for Breitbart London, and has published several novels and four political books. He describes himself as a libertarian conservative. He has frequently published articles promoting climate change denial and expressing opposition to wind power.

== Education and early life ==
Delingpole grew up near Bromsgrove, Worcestershire, the son of a businessman. He attended Malvern College from 1978 to 1983, an independent school for boys, followed by Christ Church, Oxford (1983–1986), where he studied English.

== Career ==
In addition to writing articles and commentary for the Daily Mail, the Daily Express, The Times, The Daily Telegraph, and The Spectator, Delingpole has published four political books including: How to be Right: The Essential Guide to Making Lefty Liberals History, Welcome to Obamaland: I Have Seen Your Future and It Doesn't Work, and 365 Ways to Drive a Liberal Crazy.

Delingpole is the author of several novels including Fin and Thinly Disguised Autobiography. In August 2007, Bloomsbury published his first novel of the "Coward" series, Coward on the Beach, which tells the story of a man's reluctant quest for military glory and is set on the beaches of Normandy during the D-Day landings. In June 2009 the second novel of the series, Coward at the Bridge (set during Operation Market Garden in September 1944), was published.

In 2005, Delingpole presented the Channel 4 documentary The British Upper Class, which was part of a series of three documentaries on the class system in Britain. Writing in The Guardian, the television reviewer Charlie Brooker concludes that "Delingpole succeeds in improving the image of the upper classes. Whenever he opens his mouth to defend them, they magically become 50 times less irritating. Than him."

Delingpole has been highly critical of wind farms. He has called wind turbines "environmentally damaging" and suggested that they deface the countryside.

In 2012, Delingpole began Bogpaper, a satirical blog, with Jan Skoyles. In 2013, Delingpole apologised after describing an article by a fellow journalist, which attacked the views of columnist Suzanne Moore, as giving her "such a seeing-to, she'll be walking bow-legged for weeks."

In 2015, Delingpole was named as a source for Lord Ashcroft's unauthorised biography of David Cameron (co-authored with journalist Isabel Oakeshott), Call Me Dave, about Cameron's time at university, in which Delingpole claims to have smoked cannabis with the future PM.

=== Anthropogenic global warming ===
Delingpole has repeatedly promoted climate change denial. In September 2009 he used his Daily Telegraph blog to join other denial bloggers in spreading and amplifying allegations made by Steve McIntyre on his Climate Audit blog, falsely accusing the Climatic Research Unit tree-ring climatologist Keith Briffa of wrongly selecting a particular tree-ring data series. Delingpole blogged "How the global warming industry is based on one MASSIVE lie", arguing that this discredited the 1998 hockey stick graph, though in fact that study did not use any of the data in question. He also alleged that this discredited the scene in An Inconvenient Truth in which Al Gore walks beside a graph relating past temperatures to CO_{2}, then has to use a platform lift to reach the projected future curve. However, that graph was based on Lonnie Thompson's ice core data, not tree rings, and the projected curve was for CO_{2} levels, not temperature.

In a November 2009 Telegraph blog post titled "Climategate: The Final Nail in the Coffin of 'Anthropogenic Global Warming'?", Delingpole popularised the term "Climategate" referring to the Climatic Research Unit email controversy. He also said that he does not have a science degree, but is "a believer in empiricism and not spending taxpayers' money on a problem that may well not exist." In May 2010, he gave a 15-minute talk to The Heartland Institute's conference and said that it reused a term he had seen in a follow-up comment to the Watts Up With That? blog. He quipped that "Climategate" was "the story that would change my life and, quite possibly, save Western civilisation from the greatest threat it has ever known". Subsequent investigations have cleared the scientists involved of any wrongdoing.

At various times Delingpole has said that he does not dispute that global warming has occurred, but doubts the extent to which it is man-made ("anthropogenic") or catastrophic.

In the BBC Horizon documentary "Science under Attack", broadcast in January 2011, Paul Nurse interviewed scientists and examples of those disputing their work. Delingpole dismissed the scientific consensus on global warming and scientific consensus in general, saying science has never been about consensus. When Nurse posed an analogy with a patient dismissing the consensus of an oncology team and choosing their own treatment, Delingpole resented the comparison with quackery. The programme also interviewed a man who takes yogurt to treat HIV. In response to Nurse's question as to whether he read peer reviewed papers, Delingpole maintained that as a journalist "it is not my job" to read these, as he simply had neither the time nor the expertise, but instead read internet posts and was "an interpreter of interpretations". In the Routledge Handbook of Environmental Journalism, this is described as showing Delingpole "detached from reality".

In 2012, Delingpole wrote an article in The Australian titled "Wind Farm Scam a Huge Cover-Up" containing controversial issues and tone, which was ultimately censured. Three complaints were made, and the Australian Press Council upheld three aspects of the complaints, commenting on the "offensiveness" of the comment made by a New South Wales sheep farmer, which Delingpole quoted, that made an analogy between advocates of wind farms and paedophiles.

On 10 January 2013, the UK Met Office responded to Delingpole's Daily Mail article published earlier that day, 'The crazy climate change obsession that's made the Met Office a menace', with a blog rebutting "a series of factual inaccuracies" in the piece, which included repetition of a falsehood which the Telegraph had withdrawn in 2012 following a Press Complaints Commission ruling. The Met Office refuted an assertion attributed to Global Warming Policy Foundation member David Whitehouse, but agreed with Whitehouse's statement that "when it comes to four or five day weather forecasting, the Met Office is the best in the world".

Delingpole has repeatedly incited violence against named scientists and climate campaigners. In 2013, he published an article in The Spectator, asking the question whether climate scientists like Michael E. Mann, natural scientist Tim Flannery and journalist George Monbiot should be "given the electric chair", "hanged" or "fed to the crocodiles" for speaking out on anthropogenic global warming, stating that his answer "is – *regretful sigh* – no." He said that "extreme authoritarianism and capital penalties" wouldn't be his "bag" and "perhaps more importantly, it would be counterproductive, ugly, excessive and deeply unsatisfying. The last thing I would want is for Monbiot, Mann, Flannery, Jones, Hansen and the rest of the Climate rogues' gallery to be granted the mercy of quick release. [...] But hanging? Hell no. Hanging is far too good for such ineffable toerags." He also wished to establish Nuremberg trials for climate scientists and activists, stating this is meant as a metaphor.

=== Politics ===
Delingpole has described himself "as a member of probably the most discriminated-against subsection in the whole of British society—the white, middle-aged, public-school-and-Oxbridge educated middle-class male."

Delingpole supported Tony Blair's position on the Iraq War. In February 2009 on Book TV Delingpole said "you will not find me disagreeing with Tony Blair's stance on the War on Terror. It was the one principled thing the man did in his political career."

On 6 September 2012, Delingpole announced that he would stand in the upcoming Corby by-election on an anti-wind farms platform. He withdrew, saying his campaign against wind farms had been "stunningly successful" before a vote was cast. A Greenpeace investigation said that Delingpole's campaign was supported by the Conservative Party's campaign manager for the Corby by-election, Chris Heaton-Harris. Heaton-Harris said that Delingpole had announced his candidacy as part of a "plan" to "cause some hassle" and drive the issue of wind farms up the political agenda.

In a 2013 article in The Spectator he stated that for some time "I've held dual political nationality: my heart with UKIP (United Kingdom Independence Party), my head with the Tories", going on to praise the latter as "the natural party of government in a brave new world where politicians are the people's servants, not their masters."

== Awards and prizes ==
In 2005 Delingpole was awarded the Charles Douglas-Home Memorial Trust Award for his essay "What are museums for?"

In 2010 Delingpole won the Bastiat Prize for Online Journalism for his Telegraph blog, a $3,000 prize awarded by the free-market International Policy Network for "work that promotes 'the principles and institutions of the free society'"; Damian Thompson, the Telegraph's blog editor, linked receipt of the award to the impact of Delingpole's posts on the Climatic Research Unit email controversy.

== Publications ==
- — (1997). Fish Show. Penguin. ISBN 978-0140257465.
- — (2000). Fin. Picador USA. ISBN 978-0330392686.
- — (2004). Thinly Disguised Autobiography. Picador USA. ISBN 978-0330493352.
- — (2007). Coward on the Beach. Bloomsbury UK. ISBN 9780747590705.
- — (2007). How to be Right. Headline Hardbacks. ISBN 978-0755315901.
- — (2009). Welcome to Obamaland: I Have Seen Your Future and It Doesn't Work. Regnery Publishing. ISBN 978-1-59698-588-9.
- — (2009). Coward at the Bridge. Simon & Schuster Ltd. ISBN 978-1-847373588.
- — (2011). 365 Ways to Drive a Liberal Crazy. Washington, DC: Regnery Publishing. ISBN 9781596986428.
- — (2012). Watermelons: How Environmentalists are Killing the Planet, Destroying the Economy and Stealing your Children's Future. Biteback Publishing. ISBN 9781849544054.
- — (4 January 2014). "Those Bitcoin Weirdos Might Just Be Right". The Spectator (print, online). Vol. 324, no. 9671. p. 13.

== Personal life and family ==
Delingpole is married to Tiffany Daneff, a gardening journalist. They have three children.

== References and notes ==
- Mann, M.E. (2013). The Hockey Stick and the Climate Wars: Dispatches from the Front Lines. Columbia University Press. ISBN 978-0-231-15255-6.
