= Science & Environmental Policy Project =

Advocacy group

The Science & Environmental Policy Project (SEPP) is an advocacy group financed by private contributions based in Arlington County, Virginia. It was founded in 1990 by atmospheric physicist S. Fred Singer.

SEPP disputes the prevailing scientific views on several scientific issues including climate change, ozone depletion, and the health risks of secondhand smoke.

SEPP's former chairman of the Board of Directors is listed as Rockefeller University president emeritus Frederick Seitz, a former president of the National Academy of Sciences, now deceased.

== SEPP's views ==
SEPP listed the following key issues in 2010:

- "Computer models forecast rapidly rising global temperatures, but data from weather satellites and balloon instruments show no warming whatsoever. Nevertheless, these same unreliable computer models underpin the Global Climate Treaty."
- In preparing its 1995 report, the UN-sponsored Intergovernmental Panel on Climate Change unfairly marginalized scientific views which do not support the conclusion that human activity is causing climate change.
- The Environmental Protection Agency has promulgated various regulations (pertaining to e.g. smog, ozone, environmental toxins, and particulate matter) which significantly harm the economy with negligible environmental benefit.
- No detectable increase in ultraviolet radiation has been demonstrated from thinning of the ozone layer. The ban on CFCs in developed countries is economically harmful and ineffective, because they are still produced in developing countries.
- In general, science has been misused to promote "politically correct" views, and the mechanisms of science funding contribute to a systemic bias.
- Natural resources are best managed by free-market mechanisms in the context of clearly established property rights.
- The U.S. space program should focus on crewed exploration of Mars (as opposed to uncrewed problems, or crewed exploration of low Earth orbit), with the Moon as a stepping stone.
- Efforts to protect the Earth from asteroid impact have been neglected.

On September 2, 1997, Singer said that "The possibility that global temperatures could rise because of an increase in carbon dioxide in the atmosphere is a concern that needs to be monitored...But there has been no indication in the last century that we've seen anything other than natural climate fluctuations. Both greenhouse theory and computer models predict that global warming should be more rapid in the polar regions than anywhere else," he says, "but in July the Antarctic experienced the coldest weather on record."

SEPP was the author of the Leipzig Declaration, which was based on the conclusions drawn from a November 1995 conference in Leipzig, Germany, which SEPP organized with the European Academy for Environmental Affairs.

== NIPCC ==
In 2008, The Science and Environmental Policy Project completed the organization of the Nongovernmental International Panel on Climate Change (NIPCC) as the culmination of a process that began in 2003. The NIPCC calls itself "an international coalition of scientists convened to provide an independent examination of the evidence available on the causes and consequences of climate change in the published, peer-reviewed literature – examined without bias and selectivity."

The 2008 NIPCC document titled Nature, Not Human Activity Rules the Climate: Summary for Policymakers of the Report of the Nongovernmental International Panel of Climate Change, published by The Heartland Institute, was released in February–March 2008. Singer served as General Editor and also holds the copyright.

Unnamed climate scientists from NASA, Stanford University and Princeton who were contacted by ABC News dismissed the same report as "fabricated nonsense.". In response, Singer objected to the ABC News piece, calling it "an appalling display of bias, unfairness, journalistic misbehavior, and a breakdown of ethical standards" which used "prejudicial language, distorted facts, libelous insinuations, and anonymous smears."

== See also ==
- Global warming controversy
- Ozone depletion
