= International Conference on Climate Change =

Annual climate change denial conference

The ICCC

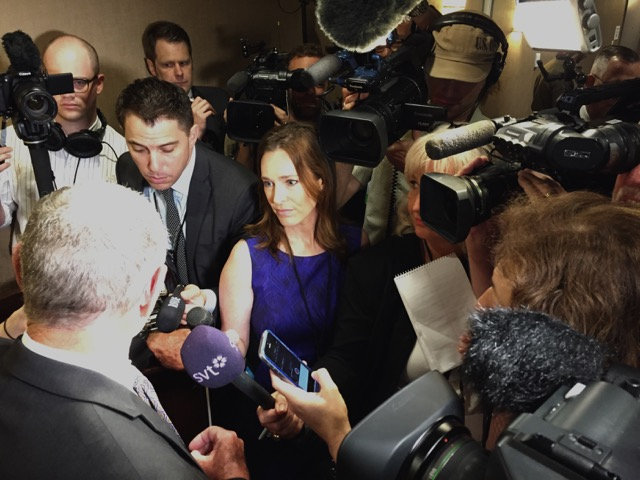
- U.S. Sen. Jim Inhofe with press at ICCC-10.
- Status: Active
- Genre: Climate change denial
- Locations: Washington, DC, (2009, 2011, 2015, 2017, 2019); New York City, (2008, 2009); Chicago, (2010, 2012); Germany (2008, 2011); Australia, (2010); Las Vegas, (2014, 2021).
- Inaugurated: March 15, 2008; 18 years ago
- Most recent: February 24, 2023; 3 years ago
- Organizer: The Heartland Institute
- Filing status: Nonprofit
- Website: climateconference.heartland.org

The International Conference on Climate Change (ICCC) is a climate change denial conference series organized and sponsored by the American think tank The Heartland Institute. The conference aims to bring together those who "dispute that the science is settled on the causes, consequences, and policy implications of climate change." The first conference took place in 2008.

== First conference, March 2008 ==
The first conference was held in New York City. Speakers included climatologist Patrick J. Michaels and physicist S. Fred Singer.

=== Nongovernmental International Panel on Climate Change ===
The conference endorsed the work of the Nongovernmental International Panel on Climate Change (NIPCC), which is a group of climate change deniers led by Fred Singer that disputes the positions of the United Nations Intergovernmental Panel on Climate Change (IPCC). Singer prepared a critique of the IPCC Fourth Assessment Report called "Nature, Not Human Activity, Rules the Climate". This NIPCC report was published in March 2008 by the Heartland Institute. ABC News said the same month that unnamed climate scientists from NASA, Stanford, and Princeton who spoke to ABC about the report dismissed it as "fabricated nonsense." In a letter of complaint to ABC News, Singer said their piece used "prejudicial language, distorted facts, libelous insinuations, and anonymous smears". Singer also said that the anonymous scientists, "are easily identified as the well-known global warming zealots Jim Hansen, Michael Oppenheimer and Steve Schneider."

=== Manhattan Declaration ===
The conference led to the release of the Manhattan Declaration, declaring that carbon dioxide is essential for all life and calling for the immediate halt to any tax funded attempts to counteract climate change. The declaration says "assertions of a supposed 'consensus' among climate experts are false" and recommends "that all taxes, regulations, and other interventions intended to reduce emissions of CO_{2} be abandoned forthwith."

It was signed by attendees at the 2008 conference, described by libertarian/conservative think-tank the Heartland Institute as consisting of "world leading climate scientists, economists, policymakers, engineers, business leaders, medical doctors, as well as other professionals and concerned citizens". Signatories include Fred Singer, Anthony Watts, Piers Corbyn, Ian Plimer, Robert M. Carter, Roy Spencer, David Bellamy, and Joe Bastardi.

== Subsequent conferences ==
The second conference was held in New York City with the theme, "Global Warming: Was It Ever Really a Crisis?" The keynote address was given by Czech Republic President Václav Klaus. Other speakers included Jack Schmitt, Richard Lindzen, Stephen McIntyre, Willam Gray, Tom McClintock and Christopher Booker.

The third conference was held in Washington, D.C. The 2009 report of the NIPCC, "Climate Change Reconsidered", was released in conjunction with the conference.

The fourth conference was held in Chicago, Illinois with the theme, "Reconsidering the Science and Economics."

The fifth conference was held in Sydney, Australia.

The sixth conference was held in Washington, D.C., with the theme, "Restoring the Scientific Method."

The seventh conference was held in Chicago, Illinois, in May 2012. The theme was "Real Science, Real Choices." Due to a controversial billboard ad run by the Heartland Institute leading up to the conference, there was a drop in attendance and expected speakers Donna Laframboise and Ross McKitrick cancelled in protest. The seventh conference was the main subject of an episode Climate of Doubt by the Frontline documentary TV series.

At the end of the seventh conference, Heartland Institute president Joseph Bast announced that there were no plans to continue the conferences, due to flagging participation and funding shortfalls. However the conferences continued.

The eighth conference was held in Munich, Germany, in November/December 2012. It was held in partnership with the European Institute for Climate and Energy (a German nonprofit organization of climate change deniers). The event doubled as the Fifth International Conference on Climate and Energy.

The ninth conference was held in Las Vegas in July 2014.

The tenth conference was held in Washington, D.C., in June 2015.

The eleventh conference on was held at the Haus der Technik in Essen, Germany, in December 2015.

The twelfth conference was held in Washington, D.C., in March 2017. Speakers included Lamar Smith, chair of the United States House Committee on Science, Space and Technology.

The thirteenth conference was held in Washington, D.C., at the Trump Hotel in July, 2019, with the theme "Best Science, Winning Energy Policies." The conference was promoted as featuring "the courageous men and women who spoke the truth about climate change during the height of the global warming scare. Now, many of them are advising the new administration or joining it in senior positions."

The fourteenth conference was in Las Vegas in October, 2021, with the theme "The Great Reset: Climate Realism vs. Climate Socialism". The conference was both in-person and live-streamed online due to Covid-19.

The fifteenth conference was in Orlando Florida, in February 2023, with the theme "Is the True Crisis Climate Change … or Climate Policy?" Keynote speakers included U.S. Senator Ron Johnson, Representative Lauren Boebert, and climate-denier fossil fuels advocate Alex Epstein.

The sixteenth conference will be in Washington, DC in April, 2026.

== See also ==
- Climate change denial
