= Manhattan Declaration =

Manhattan Declaration can refer to:

- Manhattan Declaration: A Call of Christian Conscience, an American Christian cross-denominational declaration addressing a number of political issues in 2009
- Manhattan Declaration on Climate Change, a declaration signed at the end of the 2008 International Conference on Climate Change
