= Unstoppable global warming =

Unstoppable global warming may refer to:

- Runaway climate change
- Unstoppable Global Warming, book by Fred Singer and Dennis T. Avery
