= CO2 is Green =

Climate change denialist organization

CO_{2} is Green is a non-profit organization supporting public policy on environmental issues that rejects the science of climate change. A main focus of the organization are federal proposals that may “interfere with natures dependence on carbon dioxide.” CO_{2} is Green does not view carbon dioxide as a pollutant and advocates for federal law and regulations to support this thinking.

== Founders and funding ==
The CO_{2} is Green campaign was produced by H. Leighton Steward and Corbin Robertson. Steward retired in 2000, and was the vice chairman of Burlington Resources, a Houston-based oil and gas company bought by ConocoPhillips in 2006. Robertson, the CEO of Natural Resource Partners, an owner of coal resources based in Houston. Mufson also stated that Steward and Robertson had started the campaign with about $1 million, and that both CO_{2} is Green and a related organization, Plants Need CO_{2}, has applied for 501c3 status. As to the reason he launched the campaign, Steward said, "I'm not getting a penny for this," and "It's just something I thought people should know." Additionally, according to Kate Sheppard, Steward is also the honorary director of the American Petroleum Institute.

== Reception ==
The organization denies scientific evidence for global warming and argues against proposed actions to mitigate global warming. To this end, the organization has purchased ads in major newspapers, such as The Washington Post, as well as television ads, both of which argue that proposed measures to reduce carbon dioxide emissions would have deleterious economic effects, that carbon dioxide is not the main cause of global warming, and that, in keeping with the organization's name, increasing levels of atmospheric carbon dioxide would have positive environmental effects—for example, the TV ad states that "higher CO_{2} levels than we have today would help the Earth's ecosystems," and the ad in the Washington Post states that the Waxman-Markey bill "is based on the false premise that man-made CO_{2} is a major cause of climate change," but "Real, empirical evidence indicates it is not." The ads have been met with much criticism; for example, Leo Hickman wrote that the ad "would be almost funny if it weren't so depressing."

== See also ==
- Individual and political action on climate change
- Merchants of Doubt
- The Climate Reality Project
- 350.org
