= Center for Global Food Issues =

The Center for Global Food Issues is a project of the Hudson Institute, a conservative U.S. think tank. It describes its aims as to promote agricultural free trade, encourage technical innovation in agriculture, and raise environmental awareness among farmers.

The center has received criticism from the Union of Concerned Scientists and other organizations.

Dennis Avery is the Director. His son, Alex Avery, is the Director of Research and Education.
