= Watts Up With That? =

Blog promoting climate change denial

- Website type: Blog
- Creator: Anthony Watts
- Website: wattsupwiththat.com
- Launched: November 17, 2006

Watts Up With That? (WUWT) is a blog promoting climate change denial (Note: See:) that was created by Anthony Watts in 2006.

The blog predominantly discusses climate issues with a focus on anthropogenic climate change, generally accommodating beliefs that are in opposition to the scientific consensus on climate change. Contributors include Christopher Monckton and Fred Singer as guest authors. In November 2009, the blog was one of the first websites to publish emails and documents from the Climatic Research Unit controversy, and a driving force behind its coverage.

In the early months of 2010, it was reported the site might be "the most read climate blog in the world," and in 2013 Michael E. Mann referred to it as the leading climate change denial blog.

== Content ==
Watts Up With That features material disputing the scientific consensus on climate change, including claims the human role in global warming is insignificant and carbon dioxide is not a driving force of warming. It has hosted several contributors, such as Christopher Monckton and Fred Singer, in addition to Watts. It is among the most prominent climate change denial blogs, and is described by climatologist Michael E. Mann as the most popular, having surpassed Climate Audit. Columbia Journalism School writer Curtis Brainard has written that "scientists have repeatedly criticized [Watts] for misleading readers on subjects such as the reliability of the U.S. surface temperature record."

== Temperature records ==
In 2007 WUWT readers alerted Stephen McIntyre to a discrepancy in temperature records published by the Goddard Institute for Space Studies (GISS) based on data from United States Historical Climate Network. In August 2007, McIntyre notified GISS about the problematic numbers, which GISS acknowledged and promptly corrected. The change did not affect global temperature trends, but did have the marginal effect of changing the hottest year on record for the contiguous United States to 1934, rather than 1998 as had previously been shown. In a formal acknowledgement, GISS stated that the minor data processing error had only affected the years after 2000, and noted that the contiguous United States represents only 1.6% of the Earth's surface. The result was a statistical tie between the years 1934, 1998 and 2005 as the warmest years to date for these U.S. states, with 1934 warmest by only around 0.01 °C which was well within the margin of uncertainty.

== Involvement in the Climatic Research Unit email controversy ==
In 2009, Watts Up With That was involved in popularizing the Climatic Research Unit email controversy, wherein emails of several climatologists were published by a hacker. The story was initially broken on WUWT and two other blogs when the hacker posted a link to a Russian server containing emails and documents from the Climate Research Unit of the University of East Anglia, and subsequently reproduced on the WUWT blog. Because of WUWT's high traffic count, this was the catalyst which broke the story to the media. The term "Climategate" was originally coined by a commenter in a post on WUWT.

Watts argued that the emails showed the scientists were manipulating data, and while a series of independent investigations cleared the scientists of any wrongdoing, public accusations resulting from the event continued for years. The scientific consensus that global warming is occurring as a result of human activity remained unchanged throughout the investigations, however, the reports may have decreased public confidence in climate scientists and the IPCC, and conclusively altered the Copenhagen negotiations that year.

In a 2010 interview with the Financial Times, Watts said that his blog had become "busier than ever" after the incident and that traffic to the site had tripled.

== Reception ==
According to Alexa Internet statistical analysis, Watts Up With That? is ranked No. 14,882 in the U.S. and No. 40,090 world-wide in 2015. It is reported to receive between half a million and 2 million visits per month between 2010 and 2014. It was described by climatologist Michael E. Mann in The Hockey Stick and the Climate Wars as "the leading climate change denial blog," having surpassed Climate Audit in popularity.

Watts's blog has been criticized for inaccuracy. The Guardian columnist George Monbiot described WUWT as "highly partisan and untrustworthy". Leo Hickman, at The Guardian's Environment Blog, also criticized Watts's blog, stating that Watts "risks polluting his legitimate scepticism about the scientific processes and methodologies underpinning climate science with his accompanying politicised commentary."

Between 2008 and 2013, WUWT asked its readers to vote in several internet voting-based awards, and it won "best science blog" and "best blog" from the Bloggies and the conservative Wizbang Weblog Awards. In 2013, Leo Hickman wrote in The Guardian Environment Blog that 13 of the 17 blogs nominated for the Science or Technology category for the Bloggies "were either run by climate sceptics, or popular with climate sceptics". The Bloggies founder acknowledged in 2013 that "climate sceptic" bloggers had influenced voting. He said "Unfortunately, I have no good solution for it, since they follow proper voting procedures and legitimate science blogs don't want to make an effort to compete." He discontinued the science category in 2014. WUWT did not win "Best Topical Weblog of the Year" 2014 as Watts claimed, but did enter the Hall of Fame that year.
