= Anthony Watts (blogger) =

American blogger (born 1958)

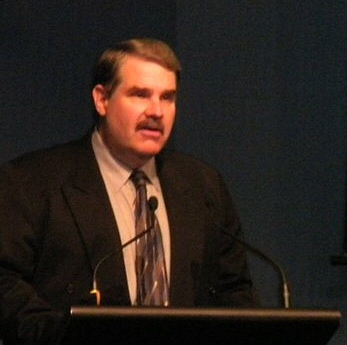
- Anthony Watts speaking in Gold Coast, Australia, June 2010
- Born: 1958 (age 67–68)
- Education: Purdue University (no degree earned)
- Occupations: Blogger, business owner, broadcast meteorologist
- Years active: 1978-present
- Employer: KPAY
- Known for: Viewpoints on climate change
- Website: wattsupwiththat.com

Willard Anthony Watts (born 1958) is an American blogger who runs Watts Up With That?, a climate change denial blog that opposes the scientific consensus on climate change. A former television meteorologist and current radio meteorologist, he is also founder of the Surface Stations project, a volunteer initiative to document the condition of U.S. weather stations. The Heartland Institute helped fund some of Watts' projects, including publishing a report on the Surface Stations project, and invited him to be a paid speaker at its International Conference on Climate Change from 2008 to 2014.

== Education and career ==
Watts assisted with the setup of a radio program for his high school in Indiana, and later attended electrical engineering and meteorology classes at Purdue University, but did not graduate or receive a degree. In 1978, Watts began his broadcasting career as an on-air meteorologist for WLFI-TV in Lafayette, Indiana.

He joined KHSL-TV, a CBS affiliate based in Chico, California, in 1987, and founded a company named ItWorks the same year. He stopped using his first name "Willard" to avoid confusion with NBC's Today weatherman Willard Scott. In 2002, he left KHSL to focus on ITWorks full-time. Watts has been the chief meteorologist for KPAY, a Fox News affiliate based in Chico, California since 2004, and the director and president of IntelliWeather Inc, a subsidiary of ItWorks, since 2000.

Watts was a member of the Chico, California school board from 2002 to 2006. In 2006, he was briefly a candidate for county supervisor, to represent Chico on the Butte County Board of Supervisors, but withdrew his candidacy due to family and workload concerns.

== Climate change opinion and activities ==
Watts rejects the scientific consensus on climate change. He believes that global warming is occurring, but that it is not as bad as has been reported, and that carbon dioxide plays a much smaller part than the Sun in causing climatic change. Watts has written that variations in solar irradiance, the Sun's magnetic field and solar wind are driving changes to the climate, contrary to the scientific consensus that the primary cause of climate change is an increase in greenhouse gases, including carbon dioxide. Climate models have been used to examine the role of the Sun in recent warming, and data collected on solar irradiance and ozone depletion, as well as comparisons of temperature readings at different levels of the atmosphere have shown that the Sun is not a significant factor driving climate change.

Watts is a signatory to the Leipzig Declaration as well as the Manhattan Declaration, which calls for the immediate halt to any tax funded attempts to counteract climate change or reduce CO_{2} emissions, and suggests the consensus among climate scientists is "false". Watts says he advocates for alternative energy sources and for the United States to "disengage from Middle East Oil."

In 2010, Watts went on a speaking tour to 18 locations around Australia. In 2014, Watts began the Open Atmospheric Society.

=== Climate change blogging ===
Watts established Watts Up With That? (WUWT) in 2006. The blog features material disputing the scientific consensus on climate change, including assertions that the human role in global warming is insignificant and carbon dioxide is not a driving force of warming. It hosts several guest bloggers, such as Christopher Monckton and the late Fred Singer, in addition to Watts. It is among the most prominent climate change denial blogs, and is described by climatologist Michael E. Mann as the most popular, having surpassed Climate Audit. In 2010, it received more than half a million views per month. Columbia Journalism School writer Curtis Brainard has written that "scientists have repeatedly criticized [Watts] for misleading readers on subjects such as the reliability of the U.S. surface temperature record."

In 2009, Watts was involved in popularizing the Climatic Research Unit email controversy, wherein emails of several climatologists were published by a hacker. Watts argued that the emails showed the scientists were manipulating data, and while a series of independent investigations cleared the scientists of any wrongdoing, public accusations resulting from the event continued for years. The scientific consensus that global warming is occurring as a result of human activity remained unchanged throughout the investigations, however, the reports may have decreased public confidence in climate scientists and the IPCC, and conclusively altered the Copenhagen negotiations that year.

=== Surface Stations project ===
An example of a photograph taken by a volunteer from the Surface Stations project, which identifies several alleged issues with the location of the weather station. This photograph was used in the report by Watts published by the Heartland Institute in 2009.

In 2007, Watts launched the Surface Stations project, encouraging volunteers to take photographs of weather stations in the U.S. Historical Climatology Network to record their condition. By 2009, around 650 volunteers had reported on around 70% of the 1,221 stations, and suggested most were below "good or best" reliability. In March 2009 The Heartland Institute published an illustrated report authored by Watts, in which he argued that the surface temperature record in the United States was inaccurate and that the actual temperature was lower than reported. Watts presented pictures from volunteers participating through his website to show that many surface weather stations were situated near artificial heat sources such as pavement and air conditioners, but did not show any comparison of the data from these sites and the data from well situated stations.

The National Oceanic and Atmospheric Administration (NOAA) investigated the matter. While acknowledging the suboptimal conditions of many stations, NOAA concluded in 2010 that any bias had been nearly eliminated by their models, which compared stations over regions and time. To the very limited extent that there was any measurement bias, it was in the opposite direction of what Watts expected: stations that were considered poorly situated reported slightly cooler temperatures.

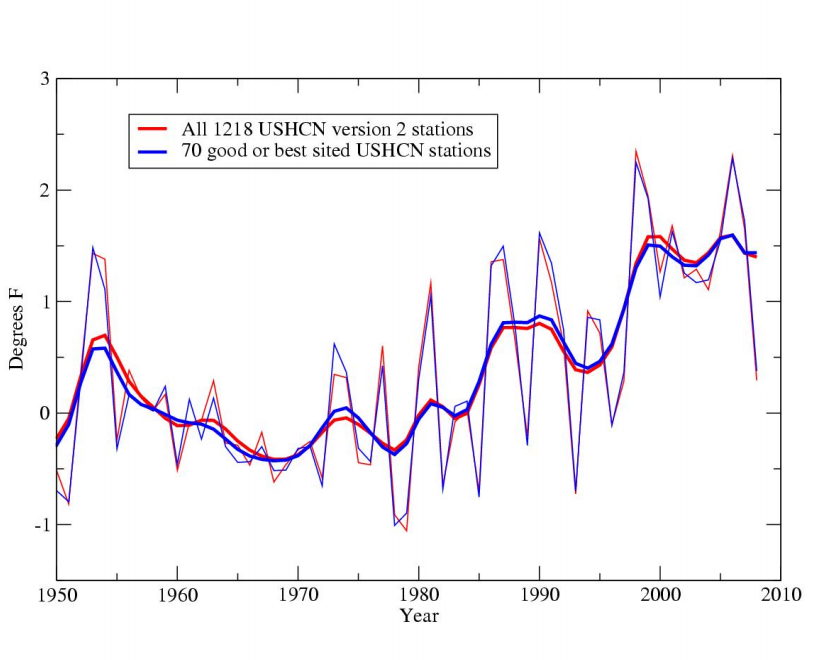
This graph shows the temperature record for the 1218 stations in NOAA’s Historical Climatology Network (USHCN) from 1950 to 2009, alongside the record for the 70 stations identified as "good or best" in Watts' report published by the Heartland Institute.

Watts was co-author with climatologists John Nielsen-Gammon, John Christy and Roger A. Pielke, Sr. on a paper with Souleymane Fall as lead author, which found that mean temperature trends were nearly identical between poorly sited and well-sited stations, but poor siting led to a difference in estimated diurnal temperature range. The poorly positioned stations led to an overestimate of trends in minimum temperatures, balanced by a similar underestimate of maximum temperature trends. This meant that the mean temperature trends were nearly identical across the stations.

==== BEST project, alleged doubling of trend by NOAA ====
In March 2011, Watts visited the Berkeley Earth Temperature project (BEST), and said "I'm prepared to accept whatever result they produce, even if it proves my premise wrong." In October the project released data and a draft of their paper which produced results supporting the existing scientific consensus. Watts said that its methodology was flawed, complaining that the BEST study analyzed a larger period than his own research, and that it was not yet peer reviewed. Richard A. Muller, founder of BEST, later said their study directly addressed Watts' concern about the condition of weather stations; "we discovered that station quality does not affect the results. Even poor stations reflected temperature changes accurately."

Around 22 July 2012, Watts heard that the BEST project was about to release further material, and decided to release a paper he and Evan Jones had been working on for about a year. The New York Times published a summary of further draft results from BEST, including an announcement from Muller that their study now showed that humans "are almost entirely the cause" of the warming. Shortly afterwards, Watts announced his own team's draft paper which said that previously reported temperature rises had been "spuriously doubled", and made the serious accusation that NOAA had inflated the rate by erroneous adjustments to the data. Climate scientists and other bloggers quickly found flaws in the paper. Steve McIntyre, whom Watts had named as a co-author, stressed that his involvement had been "very last minute and limited". He agreed with criticisms including the point that Watts had failed to correct for time of observation bias, and noted that independent satellite temperature measurements were closer to the NOAA figures.

In 2012 BEST released its series of peer-reviewed papers confirming previous results that the surface temperature is rising.

=== Connection with Heartland Institute ===
The Heartland Institute published Watts' preliminary report on weather station data, titled Is the U.S. Surface Temperature Record Reliable? Watts has appeared as a paid speaker at the International Conference on Climate Change the Heartland Institute have sponsored since 2008.

Watts says that he approached Heartland in 2011 to ask for help finding a donor to set up a website devoted to presenting NOAA's data as graphs that are easily accessible to the public. Documents obtained from the Heartland Institute in February 2012 revealed that the Institute had agreed to help Watts raise $88,000 for his project. The documents state that $44,000 had already been pledged by an anonymous donor, and the Institute would seek to raise the rest. Watts has written that, aside from the help in funding this project, the Heartland Institute does not pay him a regular salary or fund his blog.
