= Welcome to Obamaland =

Book by James Delingpole

- Author: James Delingpole
- Language: English
- Subject: Politics
- Publisher: Regnery Press
- Publication date: 26 January 2009
- Publication place: United States
- Pages: 216
- ISBN: 978-1-59698-588-9

Welcome to Obamaland: I Have Seen Your Future and It Doesn't Work is a book written by British journalist and author James Delingpole, published by Regnery Press in 2009.

The book was published at the same time Barack Obama was inaugurated as president, Delingpole having anticipated Obama's victory. Felicia Pride and Calvin Reid of Publishers Weekly wrote: "In case you thought everyone was thrilled about Barack Obama's historic election, conservative U.K. journalist Delingpole outlines a scary future under Obama-style socialism".

== Synopsis ==
Intended for an audience in the United States, Delingpole compares the UK and the US, arguing that the latter would become a failed socialist experiment. The book is written as humor, with chapters with titles such as:

"Never Trust a Hippie" (Chapter One)

"Our Enemy, Our State" (Chapter Two)

"Corrupting the Young" (Chapter Seven)

The book is based on analogies to the UK having had Tony Blair as prime minister and the detriments of the policies of his administration.

== Reception ==
Jerome C. Arnett for the Journal of American Physicians and Surgeons (publication of the Association of American Physicians and Surgeons (AAPS) a politically conservative organization founded in 1943 to "fight socialized medicine and the government takeover of medicine") wrote, "In Obamaland, author James Delingpole advises us that the land we love has been hijacked by a bunch of left-liberal zealots. They don't have much of an idea about how to fix the economy, but they do know exactly how to ruin your life, and they will. Over the next 'long, weary years' your taxes are going to rise, your standard of living is going to drop, and your liberties are going to be curtailed. The medical care of your Obamaland future is so costly it will eat up the biggest part of your tax dollar, but so terrible that even in your hour of greatest need, you'd rather walk barefoot across hot coals than ever have to use it," Delingpole writes. He believes there's not a lot we can do to stop the deluge of misery that is going to hit us now that the socialists are in charge".

Herb Denenberg writing for the Philadelphia Bulletin said, "The book covers a broad range of subjects, but one of the first things he takes up is the British national health insurance system and there’s good reason for that emphasis. He starts out by telling us he had so much envy for Americans".
