= Joe Bastardi =

American meteorologist (born 1955)

- Born: July 18, 1955 (age 71); Providence, Rhode Island, U.S.
- Education: Pennsylvania State University (1978)
- Scientific career
- Fields: Meteorology
- Workplaces: Accuweather, WeatherBELL

Joe Bastardi (born July 18, 1955) is a professional meteorologist and weather forecaster. He is a frequent guest on TV news shows. Bastardi is an outspoken denier of human-induced global warming whose public statements frequently contradict the scientific consensus on climate change.

== Biography ==
Bastardi was born in Providence, Rhode Island. He spent his childhood moving frequently, first to Texas in 1960, then to Somers Point, New Jersey, in 1965. He enrolled at Penn State University, where he was a member of the varsity wrestling team. He graduated with a bachelor's degree in meteorology in 1978. In 1992 Bastardi married Jessica Jane Strunck, also a Penn State graduate. They have a son Garrett (born 1996) and a daughter Jessica (born 1998). In his free time, Bastardi enjoys bodybuilding, and has won the NABBA American Bodybuilding Championships.

Bastardi worked for AccuWeather from 1978 until February 2011. He joined WeatherBell Analytics LLC as Chief Forecaster in March 2011.

== His work ==
Bastardi's forecasts were previously offered free to the public on AccuWeather's main site. However, in the early 2000s, AccuWeather launched its "professional site", and his forecasts were made available to paying subscribers only, up until his departure from AccuWeather in 2011. Despite his recent focus on private forecasting, Bastardi occasionally appears on cable news channels, such as CNN and Fox News.

Bastardi has produced several weather analysis videos, including "Bastardi's Big Dog" and "Long Ranger". His Long Ranger video features his thoughts on long-range trends. In addition to his videos, Bastardi contributed to official AccuWeather press releases, such as annual winter forecasts. Bastardi wrote a column that summarized his views in the videos. Bastardi sometimes contributed columns several times a day when a storm was approaching. He maintains that he has not taken a day off since 2002, including "Christmas and Easter".

As of October 2022 Bastardi is currently a Chief Forecaster at WeatherBELL Analytics LLC. At WeatherBELL Analytics he provides frequently updated blog postings and videos on the weather through WeatherBELL Premium, as well as services for commercial clients. Bastardi prefers to make definitive, rather than probabilistic, predictions.

== Stance on global warming ==
Bastardi is an outspoken denier of human-induced global warming. He has written books describing his views, which are sharply at odds with the scientific consensus on the topic.

Among Bastardi's positions that are at odds with the science: He has asserted that the world was warmer in the 1930s than today, that the human contribution of carbon dioxide is too small to have any effect, and that warming can be accounted for by sunspots and exchange with warmer oceans. He argues in his columns that extreme weather events occur naturally and that there is not enough evidence to state that such events are unusual. In 2011, Bastardi wrote that, as he had predicted three years earlier, global average temperature was falling, and by 2030 would return to levels seen in the late 1970s due to the "triple-crown of cooling", comprising oceanic temperature cycles, solar radiation cycles, and volcanic activity.

Bastardi asserts that the changes due to carbon dioxide are tiny compared with other factors, so it cannot cause global warming. He writes, "In the entire geological history of the planet, there has been no known linkage between CO_{2} and temperatures." Bastardi also states that carbon dioxide cannot cause global warming because this would violate the first law of thermodynamics. He has further explained:

CO_{2} cannot cause global warming. I'll tell you why. It doesn't mix well with the atmosphere, for one. For two, its specific gravity is 1 1/2 times that of the rest of the atmosphere. It heats and cools much quicker. Its radiative processes are much different. So it cannot -- it literally cannot cause global warming. --- Joe Bastardi, Fox Business, March 9, 2012.

Bastardi is a signatory to the Manhattan Declaration on Climate Change, which asserts "there is no convincing evidence that CO_{2} emissions from modern industrial activity has in the past, is now, or will in the future cause catastrophic climate change."

Physicist Richard A. Muller states that Bastardi's explanation of CO_{2} is "completely wrong" and "even skeptics of global warming, if they know physics, would disagree with him."

Bastardi and science popularizer Bill Nye have clashed over climate change. In 2010 they debated on Fox TV. In 2015–2016 Bastardi and Nye publicly challenged each other with predictions of mean global surface temperature in the near term.
