= Joseph Bast =

American businessman

Joseph L. Bast

President of The Heartland Institute
- In office 1984–2017
- Succeeded by: Tim Huelskamp

Personal details
- Born: Joseph Lee Bast Kimberly, Wisconsin, U.S.

Joseph Lee Bast is an American political activist. He is the former president and CEO of The Heartland Institute, an American nonprofit conservative and libertarian public policy think tank based in Arlington Heights, Illinois which advocates for climate change denialism. He retired as president and CEO in July 2017 when former Congressman Tim Huelskamp took over those roles in the organization. Huelskamp was followed as president at Heartland by Frank Lasee in 2019, and then James M. Taylor in 2020.

== Biography ==
Bast was born on January 22, 1958, in Kimberly, Wisconsin, where he attended a Catholic elementary school. He studied economics at the University of Chicago but dropped out of school in order to devote more time to the Heartland Institute. Bast married Diane Bast, who grew up with him in Kimberly.

In 1984, David Padden founded the Heartland Institute — an American conservative and libertarian public policy think tank — and put Bast in charge of the nascent organization. Bast has been president and CEO ever since. "Personally, I'm a fallen-away libertarian. I place a high value on individual freedom and I tend to look at most issues from that perspective. But I'm not sure it is the only way anymore," Bast told the Chicago Tribune in 1995.

Bast is one of the editors of the Climate Change Reconsidered series by the Nongovernmental International Panel on Climate Change (NIPCC). He was also involved in the creation of the State Policy Network, and has written several books, some of which challenge mainstream claims about cigarette smoking. In 2014, he co-authored an article entitled "The Myth of the Climate Change '97%'" in the Wall Street Journal along with Roy Spencer which argued that the oft-cited claim that "97% of the world's scientists believe climate change is an urgent problem" is misleading because the figure is derived from surveys with small sample sizes, and the questionnaire conflates belief in negligible global warming with belief in dangerous global warming. A 2011 article in Nature criticized his position on global warming and second-hand smoke.

== The Heartland Institute ==
As president of the Heartland Institute, Bast managed the institute's finances, helped organize and introduce its annual conference on climate change, and set its research and communications agenda. Bast was a regular speaker at the Heartland Institute's annual conference on climate change.

Bast and his wife, executive editor Diane Bast, published four monthly public policy newspapers distributed to elected officials: School Reform News, Health Care News, Budget & Tax News, and Environment & Climate News.

Bast told Bloomberg News that the Heartland Institute does not deny climate change, but they are skeptical of the scientific consensus that man-made global warming is a significant danger to the planet. The Heartland Institute also believes that many of the policies to fight global warming would be damaging to the economy. According to Nature, Bast does not necessarily deny that humans are having an influence on the climate, but he does question the forecasts of catastrophic impacts and the rationale for curbing carbon emissions. Bast argues that the costs of trying to prevent global warming exceed the benefits.

In a Wall Street Journal interview, Bast said that he believes the climate has warmed in the second half of the 20th century and there is likely a measurable human impact on climate. He believes the human impact on global warming is likely very small and that minimal warming is not a crisis.

According to Bloomberg News, Bast's skepticism of the dangers posed by global warming have made him "a favorite bogeyman of environmentalists." In 2012, Bast signed off on a widely criticized ad campaign that compared global warming believers to the Unabomber.

== Bibliography ==
- Eco-Sanity: A Common-sense Guide to Environmentalism (1994)
- Education and Capitalism: How Overcoming Our Fear of Markets and Economics Can Improve America's Schools (2003)
- Rewards: How to use rewards to help children learn – and why teachers don't use them well (2014)
- Bast, Joseph L (2006). Please Don't Poop in My Salad. Chicago: The Heartland Institute. ISBN 0978695909.
- Bast, Joseph L.; Gilder, George; Gilroy, Leonard; Glans, Matthew; Haney, Hance; Lehrer, Eli; Moore, Adrian; Stanek, Steve; Vedder, Richard; Walberg, Herbert J. (October 1, 2010). The Patriot's Toolbox: Eighty Principles for Restoring Our Freedom and Prosperity. The Heartland Institute. ISBN 978-1934791332.
