= Naomi Seibt =

German activist (born 2000)

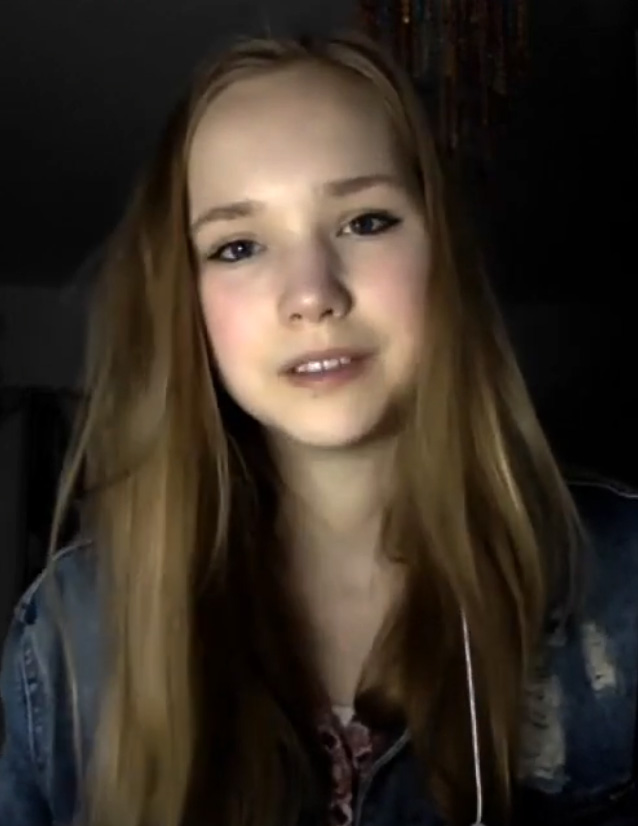
- Seibt in 2017
- Born: 18 August 2000 (age 26); Münster, Germany
- Occupations: YouTuber; public speaker
- Known for: Political activism Climate change denial Being promoted as an opposite to Greta Thunberg

Naomi Seibt (born 18 August 2000) is a German political activist aligned with the far right. From late 2019 to April 2020, she was employed by the Heartland Institute, an American right-wing and climate change denial think tank that marketed her as a polar opposite to climate activist Greta Thunberg; she was nicknamed the "anti-Greta" in the media. She has spoken at multiple events organized by conservative think tanks and has self-identified as a libertarian and an anarcho-capitalist.

== Early life ==
Seibt was born on 18 August 2000 in Münster, North Rhine-Westphalia. In a 19 February 2020 interview with Die Weltwoche, she stated that she became interested in politics when she started to attend political events with her mother in 2015. At the time, she was critical of the Christian Democratic Union (CDU) party. Seibt lives in Münster with her sister and their mother, a lawyer who has represented politicians associated with the far right Alternative für Deutschland (AfD). In September 2017, Seibt graduated from Bischöfliches Gymnasium St. Mauritz, Münster, a Catholic high school. She achieved a first place in physics in local regional competition of the Jugend forscht junior division, called "Students Experiment", and second place in mathematics.

== Career ==
When Seibt was 16, her poem on nationalism, "Sometimes I Keep Silent", was published on David Berger's anti-Islamisation blog Philosophia Perennis, as part of an AfD competition. Since May 2019, she has recorded YouTube videos, using her mobile phone, on topics ranging from migration to feminism to climate change, in which she calls herself a "climate realist". On 4 November 2019, the Süddeutsche Zeitung, one of Germany's largest daily newspapers, spoke of her appearance at the end of the European Institute for Climate and Energy's (Europäisches Institut für Klima und Energie, EIKE) annual "International Climate and Energy Conference" held in Munich on 2 November, saying, "They have their own Greta. A climate change denier Greta." In her speech, Seibt said that before she started questioning a lot of things, like feminism and "cultural socialism", she too was a "climate alarmist".

On 3 December 2019, Seibt spoke as an invited guest at the Madrid "Climate Reality Forum", a forum organized to rebut the United Nations' climate change warnings, while Greta Thunberg spoke at the 2019 United Nations Climate Change Conference (COP25) several miles away. In 2019, Germany's AfD had embraced climate change denial as part of their political campaign in Europe, and were therefore also aligned with EIKE. She was the only woman invited to speak at an event that is "traditionally dominated by older men". Seibt has previously spoken at the Heartland Institute, as well as at the Conservative Political Action Conference (CPAC) in Maryland, Seibt spoke to about a hundred conservatives. Seibt has denied allegations that she is a "puppet of the right wing or the climate deniers or the Heartland Institute".

On 28 February 2020, an article in The Guardian stated that Seibt was inspired by the Canadian alt-right, white nationalist, and conspiracy theorist Stefan Molyneux after being introduced to his blogs. She has been accused of both antisemitism and white nationalism due to her support for some on the alt-right. Seibt refused to comment; her mother denied that her daughter supports far-right politics. In April 2020, Seibt said her formal work with The Heartland Institute had come to an end. She said that it was her decision not to renew a contract, and it was made because the Landesanstalt für Medien NRW threatened to delete her YouTube channel on the grounds that she wants to influence German politics for an American think tank.

In May 2020, she endorsed QAnon, a far-right conspiracy theory alleging that Donald Trump is fighting a satanic network of paedophiles drawn from liberal elites. Recent analysis shows that Seibt's Twitter following surged after she repeatedly referenced QAnon.

In November 2020, Seibt falsely claimed that COVID-19 had not yet been isolated and the PCR testing procedure (to detect the presence of the virus) was unreliable; she falsely claimed it was only based on a computer model of the virus genome. In October 2021, she claimed in an interview with SVT that young climate activists do not have enough knowledge on climate issues to be public speakers about the issue and that they have been scared into being exploited by those in power.

In November 2025 Seibt announced that she had requested Asylum in the United States, based on INA section 208.

== Views and public image ==
As of 2024, Seibt has been described as far-right and sometimes as extreme-right. She is affiliated with, and openly endorses, the far-right party AfD. In 2020, the Neue Zürcher Zeitung described Seibt as a "right-wing Youtuber" who "attacks climate science in her videos". The Guardian described her as a "so-called 'YouTube influencer' who tells her followers that Thunberg and other activists are whipping up unnecessary hysteria by exaggerating the climate crisis". (Note: The Washington Post reported that compared to Greta Thunberg's millions of followers on social media, Seibt had about 50,000 YouTube subscribers as of 23 February 2020; her following as of late May 2020 was about 86,700. See "Naomi Seibt". May 2020 – via YouTube.) Seibt self-identifies as libertarian.

Seibt was previously a paid conservative blogger and was promoted as "Anti-Greta", in response to Greta Thunberg, aligning herself with AfD. This image was further propagated in 2019 by the Heartland Institute, who compared her to Thunberg in promotional anti-climate change campaigns. In a 2020 interview with The Washington Post, Graham Brookie, the director of the Atlantic Council's Digital Forensic Research Lab, commented on Seibt's approach to Thunberg's message on climate, in which she counters Thunberg's "I want you to panic" by saying in a video posted on Heartland's website that "I don't want you to panic. I want you to think". Brookie said in an email: "While it is not outright disinformation, ... it does bear resemblance to a model we use called the 4d's — dismiss the message, distort the facts, distract the audience, and express dismay at the whole thing. The tactic is intended to create an equivalency in spokespeople and message. In this case, it is a false equivalency between a message based in climate science that went viral organically and a message based in climate skepticism trying to catch up using paid promotion."

Seibt's influence was boosted in 2024 by Elon Musk reposting her videos on X. Musk re-tweeted a Seibt video calling on CDU leader Friedrich Merz to ally with the AfD instead of a German centre-left party like the Greens, with Musk saying "Only the AfD can save Germany." She has also been accused of promoting white nationalist ideas on X by directly engaging with groups such as QAnon, along with related accounts and channels that propagate conspiracy theories. She has likewise endorsed figures directly associated with white nationalist movements, supporting their views.

She has also been found to spread disinformation on X, including several false claims linked to far-right and white nationalist online groups across multiple platforms, such as COVID-19 and climate-related content. A number of academic and journalistic publications have emphasised the links in her ideological beliefs between climate change denialism and white nationalism. In 2020, she was also found to be promoting disinformation, and acknowledging far-right conspiracy theories propagated by groups related to QAnon.
