= Peter Ferrara =

American journalist (1955–2026)

- Born: Peter Joseph Ferrara; April 26, 1955
- Died: May 5, 2026 (aged 71)
- Occupation: Policy analyst

Peter Joseph Ferrara (April 26, 1955 – May 5, 2026) was an American lawyer, policy analyst and columnist who was an analyst for The Heartland Institute. He was general counsel for the American Civil Rights Union. A libertarian scholar, he is known for supporting privatization of the Social Security program and climate change denialism.

== Early life and education ==
Ferrara was born on April 26, 1955. He grew up in Phoenix, Arizona, and graduated in 1976 from Harvard College with an A.B. in economics magna cum laude and cum laude from Harvard Law School in 1979. At Harvard, Ferrara wrote for The Harvard Crimson, the student newspaper. While in law school, he participated in the Harvard Libertarian Association. Future Supreme Court Chief Justice John Roberts attended both Harvard College and Law School with Ferrara.

A 2005 profile for the Harvard Law Bulletin reported that Ferrara recalled at age nine "being transfixed while watching television as Barry Goldwater stormed the 1964 Republican National Convention."

== Career ==
His senior law school thesis evolved into the debut hardcover publication by the libertarian Cato Institute in 1980, Social Security: The Inherent Contradiction. From 1981 to 1983, Ferrara served in the White House Office of Policy Development under President Ronald Reagan and was an associate deputy attorney general from 1991 to 1993. Between those positions, Ferrara became a Heritage Foundation analyst specializing in Social Security issues. He also became an insurance consultant and provided expertise in Social Security to media. In 1987, Ferrara joined the faculty of the George Mason University School of Law and directed its legal writing programs until 1991. As late as 2003, Ferrara has taught there.

In the early 2000s (decade), he founded the Virginia chapter of Club for Growth and directed the International Center for Law and Economics.

As a writer, Ferrara's employers included erstwhile lobbyist and convicted felon, Jack Abramoff, who hired Ferrara to write op-ed pieces favorable to Abramoff clients. Ferrara doesn't disclose which pieces he is paid to write, but according to a Business Week article, the specific pieces may have been articles in The Washington Times about the Northern Marianas Islands and The Choctaw Indian tribe. Ferrara stated that those writings reflect his independently held views on the respective subjects. "I do that all the time. I've done that in the past, and I'll do it in the future."

Ferrara was tied to Abramoff again in 2020 in connection with AML Bitcoin after the FBI charged Abramoff with conspiracy to commit wire fraud and violating the Lobbying Disclosure Act. Ferrara wrote op-eds in favor of AML Bitcoin that were placed in The American Spectator, Investor’s Business Daily, and The Washington Times.

He was a senior policy adviser at the Institute for Policy Innovation. In April 2011, Ferrara became senior fellow for entitlement and budget policy at The Heartland Institute. He served concurrently as general counsel for the American Civil Rights Union and policy director of the Carleson Center for Welfare Reform. He was a member of the District of Columbia Bar but was more recently on inactive status.

Ferrara's articles have been published in such outlets as National Review, The Washington Times, The American Spectator, and FoxNews.com. He was a regular guest on the Thom Hartmann radio program.

== Viewpoints ==
In 1987, The New York Times published an op-ed by Ferrara in which he advocated capping the Social Security payroll tax. The newspaper also interviewed Ferrara that year about a proposal by Secretary of Health and Human Services Otis R. Bowen to expand Medicare; Ferrara criticized the program for "a lot of gaps in medical coverage for the elderly" and found "no basis for just expanding Medicare to take over coverage that private sector provides now." The George W. Bush administration championed Ferrara's plan to privatize Social Security.

National Review magazine published his essay "What Is An American?" in its September 25, 2001 issue, after the September 11 attacks. In the essay, he claims that "there are more Muslims in America than in Afghanistan", although census numbers show Afghanistan has roughly ten to fifteen times as many Muslims as the United States. The essay was reproduced in a chain e-mail claiming that an Australian dentist wrote it. Ferrara, reflecting on that essay in 2007, still stood by it and supported "more selective immigration so that the U.S. gets a 'better-educated class of Mexican immigrants.'"

Ferrara also wrote about climate change, asserting that human activity is not the cause of climate change, that "manmade global warming" is political science rather than natural science, that actual scientific evidence proves the earth is in a cooling cycle, and comparing climate change to Lysenkoism.

== Death ==
Ferrara died on May 5, 2026, at the age of 71.

== Bibliography ==
- America's Ticking Bankruptcy Bomb (2011)
- Stop the Raid: Social Security the Biggest Rip Off in History (with Denison Smith) (2008)
- Common Cents, Common Dreams: A layman's guide to social security privatization, ISBN 1882577760, (1999)
- The Choctaw Revolution: Lessons for Federal Indian Policy, ISBN 096658340X, (1998)
- Religion and the Constitution: A reinterpretation (1983)
- Social Security: The Inherent Contradiction (1980)
