= Dennis T. Avery =

- Born: October 24, 1936; Lansing, Michigan, U.S.
- Died: June 20, 2020 (aged 83); Swoope, Virginia, U.S.
- Occupations: Author, Food policy analyst
- Known for: Support of biotechnology in farming. Global warming denier.

Dennis Teel Avery (October 24, 1936 – June 20, 2020) was the director of the Center for Global Food Issues at the Hudson Institute, where he edited Global Food Quarterly.

A food policy analyst for 30 years, Dennis Avery began his career with the U.S. Department of Agriculture, served on the staff of President Lyndon Johnson's National Advisory Commission of Food and Fiber, and, prior to joining Hudson, was the senior agricultural analyst for the U.S. Department of State. He was the author of several books, including the New York Times best-seller Unstoppable Global Warming: Every 1,500 Years which he co-authored with S. Fred Singer of George Mason University in Virginia.

Avery was an outspoken supporter of biotechnology, pesticides, irradiation, industrial farming, and free trade, as well as a long-time critic of organic farming and farm subsidies. He did not believe that DDT causes egg shell thinning in eagles. Hudson Institute's financial backers include major agricultural companies (e.g. ConAgra, Cargill) and pesticide manufacturers (e.g. Monsanto Company, DuPont, Dow-Elanco, Sandoz, Ciba-Geigy.

Dennis T. Avery died on June 20, 2020, at the age of 83. He was also the father of Alex Avery, Adam Avery and Kevin Kelly.

== Organic food and E. coli ==
According to critics Avery was the source of a claim that organic food is more dangerous to eat than food produced using chemical pesticides because of usage of animal manure in organic farming. Specifically, in a 1998 article for The Wall Street Journal, he claimed the Centers for Disease Control (CDC) had conducted studies showing that eating an organic diet carried an 8-times the risk of E. coli infection than eating a conventional diet. Despite the fact that the CDC had never conducted any such testing, the Avery article was widely quoted. The New York Times wrote about him: "Dennis T. Avery wants organic food to go away. And he doesn't care what it takes."

== Climate change ==
Avery believed that global warming is part of a natural cycle and therefore unstoppable. Avery also predicted that the next 20 to 30 years would bring cooling temperatures. These views are contradicted by the scientific consensus on the effects of global warming, that humans have had an unprecedented impact on Earth's climate system and caused change on a global scale, and expects climate change to have a significant and irreversible negative impact on climate and weather events around the world, posing severe risks like ocean acidification and sea level rise to human society and to other organisms.

== Bibliography ==
- Global Food Progress 1991 (1991)
- Saving the Planet With Pesticides and Plastic: The Environmental Triumph of High-Yield Farming (August 2000)
- Unstoppable Global Warming: Every 1,500 Years (with Fred Singer) (February 2007)
