= Carbon Brief =

British climate change news site

- Website type: Climate and energy
- Available in: English
- Website: www.carbonbrief.org
- Launched: 6 December 2010; 15 years ago
- Current status: Active

Carbon Brief is a UK-based website specialising in the science and policy of climate change. It has won awards for investigative journalism and data visualisation. Leo Hickman is the director and editor for Carbon Brief.

== Founding ==
Carbon Brief is funded by the European Climate Foundation, and has their office located in London. The website was established in response to the Climategate controversy.

== Reception ==
Carbon Brief's climate-and-energy coverage is often cited by news outlets and climate related websites.

== Awards ==
The Royal Statistical Society gave Carbon Brief a "Highly Commended" award for investigative journalism in 2018, for the article "Mapped: How UK foreign aid is spent on climate change", authored by Leo Hickman and Rosamund Pearce, and in 2020 in the category data visualisation for "How the UK transformed its electricity supply in just a decade". In 2017, Carbon Brief won the Drum Online Media Award for "Best Specialist Site for Journalism".

Carbon Brief's editor Leo Hickman was named 2020 Editor of the Year by the Association of British Science Writers. The judges commented:

He’s had the courage to give his journalists extra time and latitude to research complex but vital climate issues, championing a long-form format that’s desperately needed to convey the full story at a juncture when time to do something about climate change is running out. Also, the interactive graphics are absolutely awesome, and make otherwise dry subjects much more fun and entertaining. And to extend geographical reach, he’s getting the material translated into multiple other languages.

== See also ==
- Climate Central
- Skeptical Science
