= Unstoppable Global Warming =

2006 book by Siegfried Fred Singer and Dennis T. Avery

Unstoppable Global Warming: Every 1,500 Years
- Author: Siegfried Fred Singer, Dennis T. Avery
- Language: English
- Subject: global warming
- Genre: Science
- Publisher: Rowman & Littlefield
- Publication date: 28 October 2006
- Publication place: United States
- Pages: 260
- ISBN: 978-0-7425-5117-6

Unstoppable Global Warming: Every 1,500 Years is a book about climate change, written by Siegfried Fred Singer and Dennis T. Avery, which asserts that natural changes, rather than CO_{2} emissions, are the primary cause of global warming. Published by Rowman & Littlefield in 2006, the book sold well and was reprinted in an updated edition in 2007.

The title refers to the hypothesis of 1,500-year climate cycles in the Holocene first postulated by Gerard C. Bond, mainly based on petrologic tracers of drift ice in the North Atlantic.

== Synopsis ==
Over sixteen chapters the authors present their view of the natural cycles in the Earth's climate and argue against the view that the current warming period is primarily caused by man-made greenhouse gas emissions.

The book begins with the Earth's climate timeline, starting from the formation of the Earth 4.5 billion years ago, and leading up to the Modern Warm Period.

The book ends with a chapter titled "The ultimate failure of the Kyoto Protocol", which predicted that the Protocol would be unsuccessful in curtailing emissions. It covers the localised plummeting emissions associated with the collapse of the Soviet Union and what the book says is Russia's excess amount of Carbon Credits which, the book argues, will be purchased by European nations to offset their rising emissions.

== Reception ==
The book has attracted opposite reactions from the denialist scene and economists on one hand and from scientists on the other. The Heartland Institute, which is known for its global warming denial, arranged for the distribution of free copies to elected officials. Jay Lehr, an economist and Heartland Institute's "science director", wrote a favorable review in News Weekly, the newsletter of the Australian political movement National Civic Council, calling the book "truly amazing". Economist Richard W. Rahn in The Washington Times welcomed it as "a wonderful new book".

Climatologist Mike Hulme writing for The Guardian pointed out that the warming predicted by Bond's cycles is too small to account for the warming that actually observed. He said, "Deploying the machinery of scientific method allows us to filter out hypotheses – such as those presented by Singer and Avery – as being plain wrong". David Archer wrote a point-by-point refutation of claims by Avery and Singer on the RealClimate website.

== See also ==
- Bond event
- Merchants of Doubt
