= Robert M. Carter =

New Zealand geologist (1942–2016)

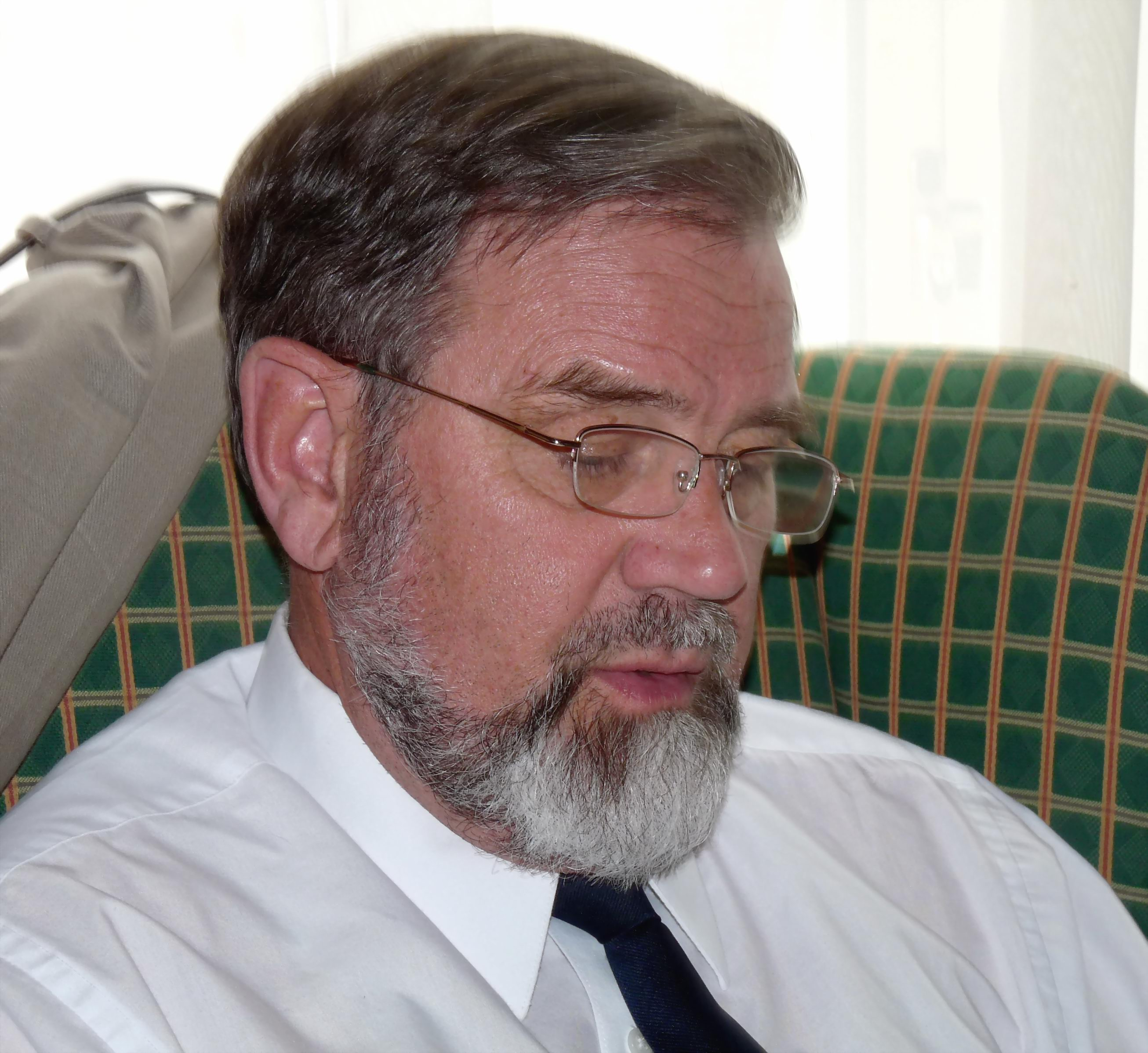
- Born: Robert Merlin Carter; 9 March 1942; Reading, England
- Died: 19 January 2016 (aged 73); Townsville, Australia
- Other name: Bob
- Citizenship: British, Australian
- Education: University of Otago, University of Cambridge
- Awards: Hochstetter Lecturer, Geological Society of New Zealand (1975), Honorary Fellow, Royal Society of New Zealand (1997)
- Scientific career
- Fields: Earth Science, Geology, Paleontology
- Workplaces: University of Otago, University of Adelaide, James Cook University
- Thesis: The Functional Morphology of Bivalved Mollusca (1968)
- Doctoral advisor: M. J. S. Rudwick

Robert Merlin Carter (9 March 1942 – 19 January 2016) was an English palaeontologist, stratigrapher and marine geologist. He was professor and head of the School of Earth Sciences at James Cook University in Australia from 1981 to 1998, and was prominent in promoting anthropogenic climate change denial.

== Early life and education ==
Carter was born in Reading, England on 9 March 1942 and emigrated to New Zealand in 1956, where he attended Lindisfarne College. He obtained a B.Sc. (Hons) in geology from the University of Otago in 1963 and returned to England to complete a Ph.D. in paleontology from the University of Cambridge in 1968. His doctoral thesis was titled The Functional Morphology of Bivalved Mollusca.

== Career ==
Carter began his career as an assistant lecturer in geology at the University of Otago in 1963 and advanced to senior lecturer after obtaining his Ph.D. in 1968. He was professor and head of the School of Earth Sciences at James Cook University from 1981 to 1998, an adjunct research professor at the Marine Geophysical Laboratory at James Cook University from 1998 to 2005 and a visiting research professor in geology and geophysics at the University of Adelaide from 2001 to 2005.

He published papers on taxonomic palaeontology, palaeoecology, the growth and form of the molluscan shell, New Zealand and Pacific geology, stratigraphic classification, sequence stratigraphy, sedimentology, the Great Barrier Reef, Quaternary geology, and sea-level and climate change. Carter published primary research in the field of palaeoclimatology, investigating New Zealand's climate extending back to 3.9 Ma.

Carter retired from James Cook University in 2002, maintaining the status of "adjunct professor" until January 2013, when Carter's position of adjunct professor was not renewed. He maintained an association with several think tanks that disagree with some aspects of the scientific consensus on climate change. He was a founding member of the New Zealand Climate Science Coalition, an emeritus fellow and science policy advisor at the Institute of Public Affairs, a science advisor at the Science and Public Policy Institute, and the chief science advisor for the International Climate Science Coalition (ICSC).

He served as chair of the Earth Sciences Discipline Panel of the Australian Research Council, director of the Australian Office of the Ocean Drilling Program (ODP), and Co-Chief Scientist on ODP Leg 181 (Southwest Pacific Gateway).

Carter was a member of the American Geophysical Union, the Geological Society of America, the Geological Society of Australia, the Geological Society of New Zealand and the Society for Sedimentary Geology.

Robert Carter died on 19 January 2016 after a heart attack at the age of 73.

== Views on global warming ==
Carter was critical of the IPCC and believed statements about dangerous human-caused global warming to be unjustified. He was on the research committee of the Institute of Public Affairs, an Australian free-market think tank which promotes climate change denial, and connected with its subsidiary think-tanks. In April 2006, he argued against climate change being "man-made" by asserting that the global average temperature "had stopped" for the eight years since 1998, while the carbon dioxide in the atmosphere increased. Chris Mooney refers to this article as an early example of statistically misleading use of the short period from the exceptionally strong El Niño year of 1998 which had set a temperature record. In 2007, Carter participated in an expert panel discussion after the airing of The Great Global Warming Swindle documentary on ABC.

His position on global warming was criticized by other scientists such as David Karoly, James Renwick and Ove Hoegh-Guldberg. In 2007, Wendy Frew, an environmental reporter with The Sydney Morning Herald, stated Carter "appears to have little standing in the Australian climate science community."

He published several critiques of global warming in economics journals. In 2009, he co-authored a paper in the Journal of Geophysical Research, which argued that the El Niño–Southern Oscillation accounted for most of the global temperature variation of the last fifty years. A rebuttal by nine other scientists was published in the same issue.

Carter appeared as a witness before the 2009 select committee on climate policy of the Parliament of Australia, and testified before the United States Senate on the issue of human-caused climate change. He appeared in the media speaking for the Nongovernmental International Panel on Climate Change (NIPCC), a contrarian report backed by The Heartland Institute, a free-market think tank opposed to climate change responses. He was a contributor and reviewer of their 2009 report Climate Change Reconsidered, and lead author of the 2011 interim report.

In 2012, documents acquired from The Heartland Institute think tank revealed that Carter was paid a monthly fee of US$1,667 "as part of a program to pay 'high-profile individuals who regularly and publicly counter the alarmist [anthropogenic global warming] message'." While Carter did not deny that the payments took place, he declined to discuss the payments. Carter emphatically denied that his scientific opinion on climate change could be bought.

== Awards and honors ==
- 1975 – Hochstetter Lecturer, Geological Society of New Zealand
- 1992 – Allan P. Bennison Distinguished Overseas Lecturer, American Association of Petroleum Geologists
- 1997 – Honorary Fellow, Royal Society of New Zealand
- 1998 – Special Investigator Research Award, Australian Research Council

== Selected publications ==
- Carter, Robert M. (1998). "Two models: global sea-level change and sequence stratigraphic architecture". Sedimentary Geology. 122 (1–4): 23–36. Bibcode:1998SedG..122...23C. doi:10.1016/S0037-0738(98)00111-0.
- Carter, Robert M. (2004). "New Zealand Maritime Glaciation: Millennial-Scale Southern Climate Change Since 3.9 Ma". Science. 304 (5677): 1659–1662. Bibcode:2004Sci...304.1659C. doi:10.1126/science.1093726. PMID 15192226. S2CID 24028315.
- Carter, Robert M. (2005). "A New Zealand climatic template back to c. 3.9 Ma: ODP Site 1119, Canterbury Bight, south-west Pacific Ocean, and its relationship to onland successions". Journal of the Royal Society of New Zealand. 35 (1–2): 9–42. Bibcode:2005JRSNZ..35....9C. doi:10.1080/03014223.2005.9517776. S2CID 131332358.
- Carter, Robert M.; de Freitas, Chris; Goklany, Indur M.; Holland, David; Lindzen, Richard S. (2007). "Climate Science and the Stern Review". World Economics. 8 (2): 161–182.
- Carter, Robert M. (2008). "Knock, Knock: Where is the Evidence for Dangerous Human-Caused Global Warming?" (PDF). Economic Analysis and Policy. 38 (2): 177–202. doi:10.1016/S0313-5926(08)50016-6. Archived from the original on 28 July 2011.
- McLean, J. D.; de Freitas, C. R.; Carter, R. M. (2009). "Influence of the Southern Oscillation on tropospheric temperature". Journal of Geophysical Research. 114 (D14): D14104. arXiv:0908.1828. Bibcode:2009JGRD..11414104M. doi:10.1029/2008JD011637.
- Land, Marissa; Wust, Raphael A.J.; Robert, Christian; Carter, Robert M. (2010). "Plio-Pleistocene paleoclimate in the Southwest Pacific as reflected in clay mineralogy and particle size at ODP Site 1119, SE New Zealand". Marine Geology. 274 (1–4): 165–176. Bibcode:2010MGeol.274..165L. doi:10.1016/j.margeo.2010.04.001.
- Carter, Robert M. (2010). Climate: the Counter Consensus. Stacey International. ISBN 978-1906768294.
- Carter, Robert M.; Spooner, J. (2013). Taxing Air: Facts and Fallacies about Climate Change. with Bill Kinninmonth, Martin Feil, Stewart Franks, Bryan Leyland. Kelpie Press. ISBN 9780646902180.
