= James Taylor (lawyer) =

American lawyer

James M. Taylor

President of The Heartland Institute
- Incumbent
- Assumed office 2020
- Preceded by: Frank Lasee

Personal details
- Education: Dartmouth College; Syracuse University (JD)

James M. Taylor is president of the Heartland Institute, a libertarian and conservative nonprofit think tank founded in Illinois in 1984.

== Education ==
Taylor earned a bachelor's degree in government from, and studied atmospheric science while a student at, Dartmouth College. He earned a JD from Syracuse University.

== Career ==
Taylor has studied and communicated about climate and energy policy for more than 20 years, was founding director of Heartland's Arthur B. Robinson Center for Climate and Environmental Policy and, from 2001 to 2014, was the managing editor of the Heartland Institute-published Environment & Climate News. He is the co-author of Climate at a Glance for Teachers and Students: Facts on 30 Prominent Climate Topics, was author of a regular column for Forbes, and has given analysis on environment and energy topics for numerous media organisations and conferences including CNN, CNN Headline News, Fox News Channel, Fox Business Channel, MSNBC, PBS News Hour, PBS Frontline, CBS Evening News, ABC World News, multiple major newspapers, the National Conference of State Legislatures (NCSL), American Legislative Exchange Council (ALEC), Council of State Governments, National Association of Counties, National Foundation of Women Legislators, State Policy Network (SPN), CPAC, Cato Institute, Heritage Foundation, and the European Institute for Climate and Energy. Taylor praised EPA administrator Lee Zeldin, a known climate skeptic, as "the greatest EPA administrator ever."
