= Alex Avery (writer) =

American author and researcher

Alex Avery is the former director of research and education with the Center for Global Food Issues at the Hudson Institute, where he conducted research on the environmental impacts of different farming systems. He is the author of The Truth About Organic Foods, a controversial book critical of the organic food movement's attacks on agricultural biotechnology — technology which, Avery says, "offers a more cost-effective way to achieve lower pesticide use and more eco-friendly farming systems..." The book is published by Henderson Communications, a small agribusiness consulting group and independent agricultural-oriented publisher.

The New York Times has written that Avery's non-profit employer as of 2003, the Hudson Institute, has received funding from Monsanto Company, DowElanco and the Ag-Chem Equipment Company.

Avery has appeared on or been quoted in TV and newspapers. Avery has written a chapter for a book on organic pesticides published in 2007 by the American Chemical Society. Avery is the son of food policy analyst Dennis Avery.
