= Leo Hickman =

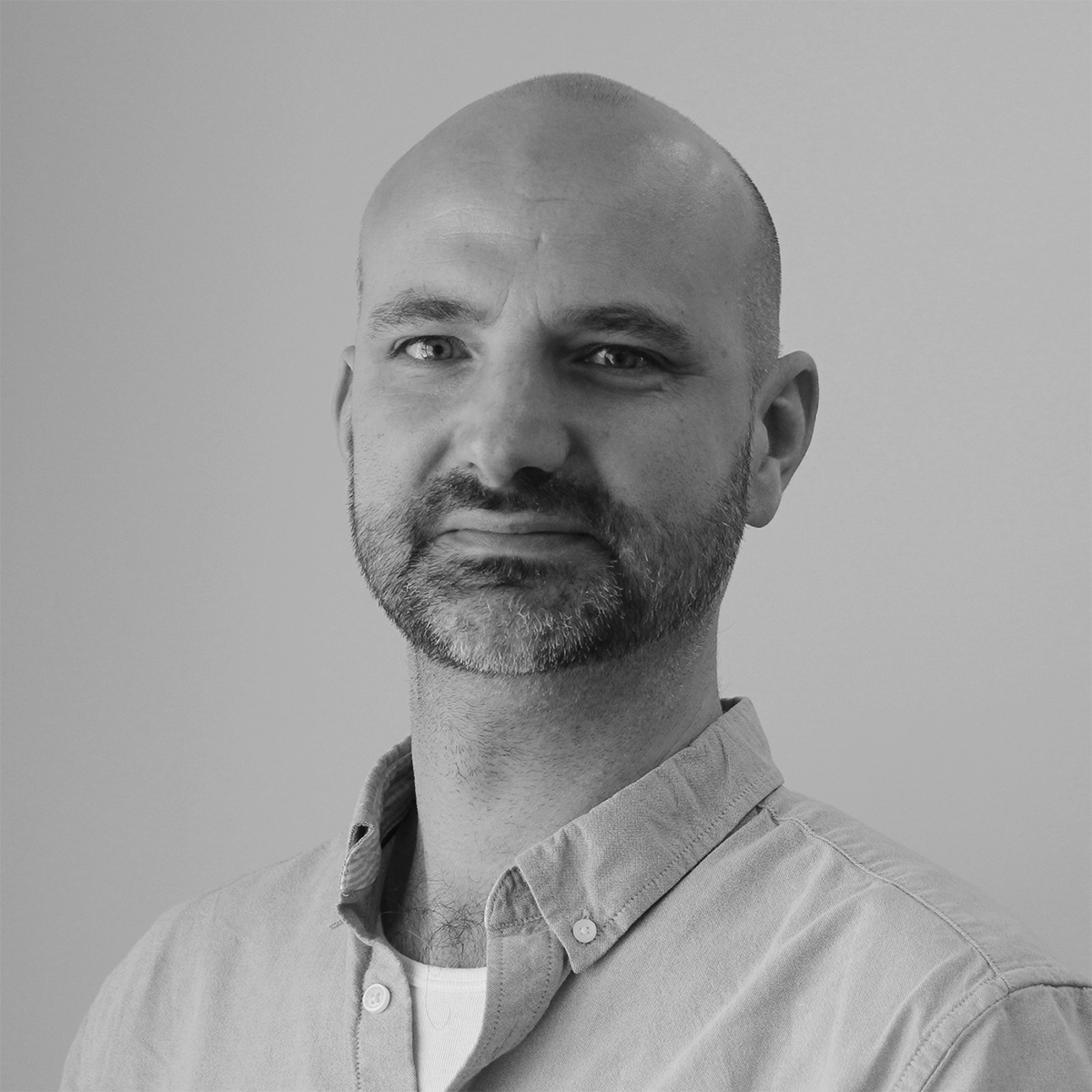
Hickman in 2018

Leo Hickman is a journalist specialising in climate change and has been the editor and director of CarbonBrief since 2015. Previously, he was a features journalist and editor with The Guardian from 1997 to 2013. From September 2013 to December 2014, he worked as the chief advisor on climate change for the UK branch of the World Wide Fund for Nature.

== Life ==
Hickman grew up in Cornwall, about 400 yards away from what was to become the Eden Project. He studied in the School of English and American Studies (ENGAM) at the University of Sussex, graduating in art history in 1994.

== Work ==
Hickman wrote for the Ethical Living section of Guardian Unlimited, offering advice on readers' ethical concerns, and wrote two books on the theme: Life Stripped Bare: My Year Trying To Live Ethically and A Good Life. In 2007, he published a third book, The Final Call, discussing the ethics of tourism, and in 2008 he published Will Jellyfish Rule the World?, a book about climate change for children.

== Awards ==
In 2020, Hickman was named "Editor of the Year" by the Association of British Science Writers. In 2013, he was awarded an honorary DLitt by the University of Exeter, where he is a visiting lecturer in the department of geography.

== Publications ==
- Life Stripped Bare: My Year Trying To Live Ethically
- A Good Life
- The Final Call
- Will Jellyfish Rule the World?
