= Heartland Institute =

Conservative and libertarian American think tank

Coordinates: 42°08′51″N 88°00′15″W

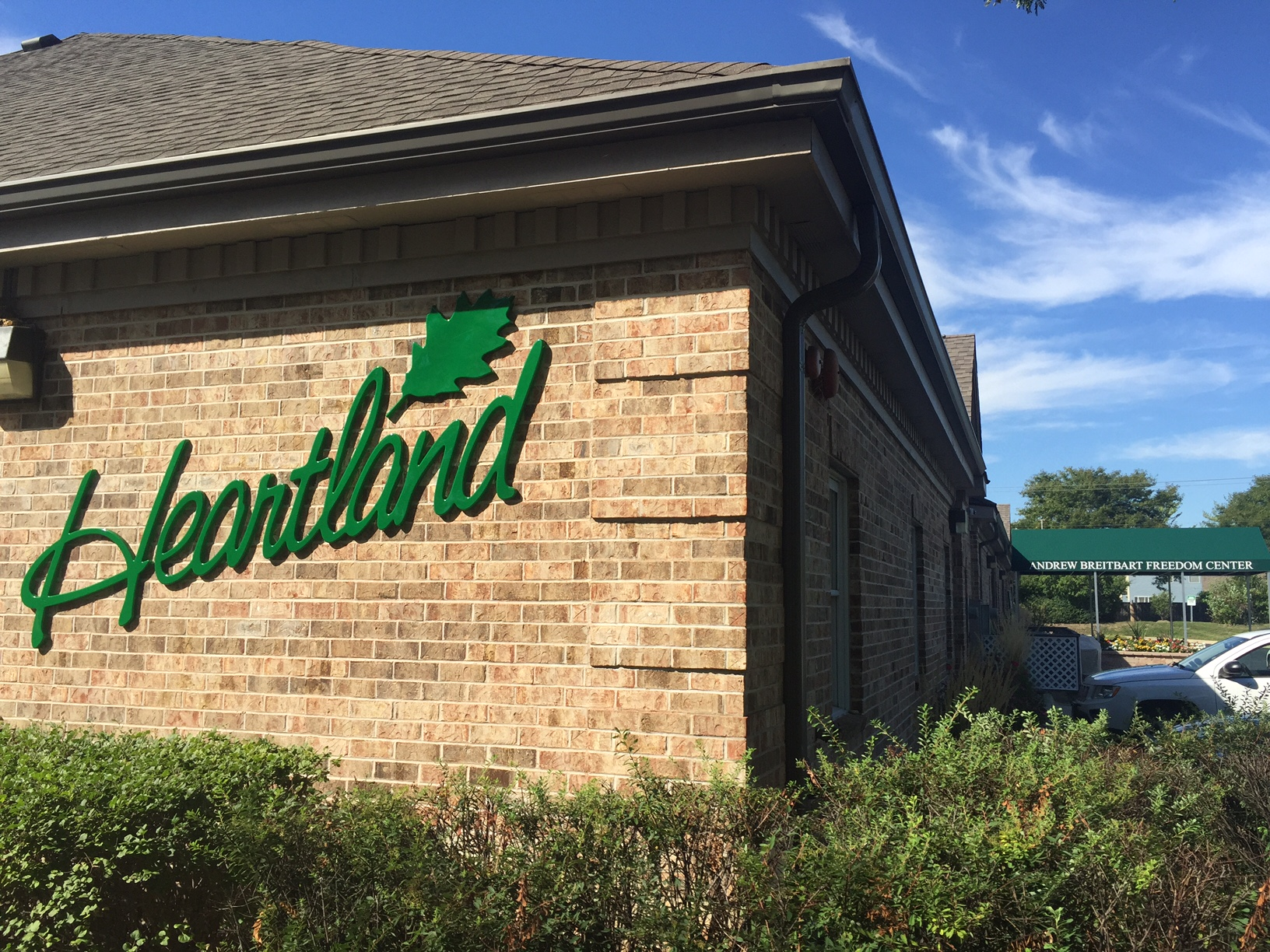
- Heartland Institute in 2016
- Formation: 1984 (42 years ago)
- Founders: David H. Padden; Joseph Lee Bast
- Type: Nonprofit
- Tax ID no.: 36-3309812
- Legal status: 501(c)(3)
- Purpose: Public policy analysis
- Headquarters: 1933 N. Meacham Rd, Suite 550; Schaumburg, IL 60173; United States
- President: James M. Taylor
- Chairman: Joseph A. Morris
- Key people: James Lakely Vice President (Note: James Lakely has been Vice President since March 2010.)
- Revenue: $3.35 million (2024)
- Expenses: $3.7 million (2024)
- Website: heartland.org

The Heartland Institute is an American conservative and libertarian 501(c)(3) nonprofit public policy think tank known for its rejection of both the scientific consensus on climate change and the negative health impacts of smoking.

Founded in 1984, it worked with tobacco company Philip Morris throughout the 1990s to attempt to discredit the health risks of secondhand smoke and lobby against smoking bans. Since the 2000s, the Heartland Institute has been a leading promoter of climate change denial.

== History ==
The institute was founded in 1984 by Chicago investor David H. Padden, who served as the organization's chairman until 1995. Padden had been a director of the Cato Institute, a libertarian think tank headquartered in Washington, D.C., since its founding as the Charles Koch Foundation in 1974. Padden was also a former director of Citizens for a Sound Economy, the Acton Institute, the Foundation for Economic Education, and the Center for Libertarian Studies. At age 26, Joseph L. Bast became Heartland's first employee. Bast's wife, Diane, was Heartland's publications director.

In the 1990s, the Heartland institute worked with the tobacco company Philip Morris to question serious cancer risks from secondhand smoke, and to lobby against government public-health regulations. Starting in 2008, Heartland has organized conferences to question the scientific consensus on climate change.

After the election of U.S. president Barack Obama in November 2008, the institute became involved with the Tea Party movement. In 2011, the organization's director of communications said that "the support of the Tea Party groups across the country has been extremely valuable." Heartland was among the organizers of the September 2009 Tea Party protest march, the Taxpayer March on Washington.

In March 2020, Heartland laid off staff, reportedly in response to financial issues; they also removed its president, Frank Lasee.

Since 2023, the institute has worked with right-wing members of the European Parliament (MEPs) from Poland, Hungary and Austria, helping coordinate campaigns against proposed environmental laws.

In December 2024, the institute opened a European branch, Heartland UK/Europe, in London. The opening was attended by former UK prime minister Liz Truss; Nigel Farage, the leader of the right-wing Reform UK party, and several Tory MPs.

== Policy positions ==
The institute advocates free market policies. The policy orientation of Heartland has been described as conservative, libertarian, and right wing.

=== Tobacco regulation ===
Heartland has long questioned the links between tobacco smoking, secondhand smoke, and lung cancer and the social costs imposed by smokers. One of Heartland's first campaigns was to oppose tobacco regulation. According to the Los Angeles Times, Heartland's advocacy for the tobacco industry is one of the two things Heartland is most widely known for.

During the 1990s, the institute worked with tobacco company Philip Morris to question the links between smoking, secondhand smoke and health risks. Philip Morris commissioned Heartland to write and distribute reports. Heartland published a policy study which summarized a jointly prepared report by the Association of Private Enterprise Education and Philip Morris. The institute also undertook a variety of other activities on behalf of the tobacco industry, including meeting with legislators, holding off-the-record briefings, and producing op-eds, radio interviews, and letters.

A 1993 internal "Five Year Plan" from Philip Morris to address environmental tobacco smoke regulation called for support for the efforts of the institute. In 1996, Heartland president and chief executive officer Joe Bast wrote an essay entitled "Joe Camel is Innocent!," which said that contributions from the tobacco industry to Republican political campaigns were most likely because Republicans "have been leading the fight against the use of 'junk science' by the Food and Drug Administration and its evil twin, the Environmental Protection Agency." In the "President's Letter" in the July 1998 issue of The Heartlander, the institute's magazine, Bast wrote an essay "Five Lies about Tobacco", which said "smoking in moderation has few, if any, adverse health effects." In 1999, Bast referenced the essays in soliciting financial support from Philip Morris, writing "Heartland does many things that benefit Philip Morris' bottom line, things that no other organization does." A Philip Morris executive, Roy Marden, the firm's manager of industrial affairs, was a member of the board of directors of the institute. Marden collected Key Actions promised by think tanks Heartland's were "blast faxes to state legislators, off-the-record briefings, op-eds, radio interviews, letters". In 2005, the institute opposed Chicago's public smoking ban, at the time one of the strictest bans in the country. In 2008, Heartland's Environment and Climate News ran an article claiming no danger from secondhand smoke, featuring image of man puffing smoke next to a young girl. In 2011, Environment and Climate News ran article by Fred Singer casting doubt on United States Environmental Protection Agency 1993 findings of harm.

=== Climate change ===
The institute rejects the scientific consensus on climate change, and promotes climate change denial with claims that the amount of climate change is not catastrophic, claims that climate change might be beneficial, and that the economic costs of trying to mitigate climate change exceed the benefits. According to The New York Times, Heartland is "the primary American organization pushing climate change skepticism." The institute has been a member of the Cooler Heads Coalition, a group dedicated to denying climate change science, since 1997. Institute staff "recognize that climate change is a profound threat to our economic and social systems and therefore deny its scientific reality," wrote Naomi Klein in This Changes Everything.

In their 2010 book Merchants of Doubt, Naomi Oreskes and Erik M. Conway wrote that the institute was known "for its persistent questioning of climate science, for its promotion of 'experts' who have done little, if any, peer-reviewed climate research, and for its sponsorship of a conference in New York City in 2008 alleging that the scientific community's work on global warming is fake." The Oxford Handbook of Climate Change and Society in a chapter "Organized Climate Change Denial" identified Heartland as a conservative think tank with a strong interest in environmental and climate issues involved in climate change denial. Heartland "emerged as a leading force in climate change denial" in the decade 2003–2013, according to sociology professor Riley Dunlap of Oklahoma State University and political science professor Peter J. Jacques of the University of Central Florida. Historians James Morton Turner and Andrew Isenberg describe Heartland as a leader in the "scientific misinformation campaign" against climate change.

Fred Singer was the founder and president of the closely-allied Science and Environmental Policy Project, and Heartland is a member organization of the Cooler Heads Coalition.

"Heartland's influence on national climate policy is at an apex" in March 2017 according to PBS Frontline.

The institute previously employed German YouTube personality Naomi Seibt as an "anti-Greta". The institute's president, James Taylor, considered Seibt the star of its "media strategy for the masses" in the "fight against climate protection measures" which "needs a better image"—to "move away from old white men and instead showcase a younger generation."

==== Heartland's list of scientists said to doubt global warming ====
In 2008, the institute published a list purporting to identify "500 Scientists with Documented Doubts of Man-Made Global Warming Scares". The Sydney Morning Herald reported that the work of Jim Salinger, chief scientist at New Zealand's National Institute of Water and Atmospheric Research, was "misrepresented" as part of a "denial campaign". In response to criticism, the institute changed the title of the list to "500 Scientists Whose Research Contradicts Man-Made Global Warming Scares." Heartland did not remove any scientist's name from the list. Avery explained, "Not all of these researchers would describe themselves as global warming skeptics...but the evidence in their studies is there for all to see." The institute's then president, Joseph Bast, argued that the scientists "have no right—legally or ethically—to demand that their names be removed" from Heartland's list. (Note: Heartland's president, Joseph Bast, wrote "They have no right—legally or ethically—to demand that their names be removed from a bibliography composed by researchers with whom they disagree. Their names probably appear in hundreds or thousands of bibliographies accompanying other articles or in books with which they disagree. Do they plan to sue hundreds or thousands of their colleagues? The proper response is to engage in scholarly debate, not demand imperiously that the other side redact its publications.")

==== International Conferences on Climate Change ====

Heartland's conventions of climate change doubters are one of the things the institute is largely known for, according to the Los Angeles Times. Between 2008 and 2023, the institute organized fifteen International Conferences on Climate Change, bringing together hundreds of global warming deniers. Conference speakers have included Richard Lindzen, a professor of meteorology at MIT; Roy Spencer, a research scientist and climatologist at the University of Alabama in Huntsville; S. Fred Singer, a senior fellow of the institute and who was founding dean of the School of Environmental and Planetary Sciences at the University of Miami and founding director of the National Weather Satellite Service; Harrison Schmitt, a geologist and former NASA astronaut and Apollo 17 moonwalker; Dr. John Theon, atmospheric scientist and former NASA supervisor; and Wei-Hock "Willie" Soon, a part-time employee of the Solar and Stellar Physics (SSP) Division of the Harvard-Smithsonian Center for Astrophysics.

At the first conference in 2008, participants criticized the Intergovernmental Panel on Climate Change and Al Gore. In 2010 the BBC reported that the heavily politicized nature of the Heartland conferences led some "moderate" climate skeptics to avoid them. In an article in The Nation, the 2011 conference was described as "the premier gathering for those dedicated to denying the overwhelming scientific consensus that human activity is warming the planet". The 2012 conference was the main subject of the film Climate of Doubt by the Frontline documentary TV series. At the conclusion of that conference, Bast announced that the organization might discontinue the conferences. But the conference series continued; the fifteenth was held in 2023.

==== "Unabomber" billboard campaign ====
On Thursday May 3, 2012, Heartland launched an advertising campaign in the Chicago area, and put up digital billboards along the Eisenhower Expressway in Maywood, Illinois, featuring a photo of Ted Kaczynski, the "Unabomber" whose mail bombs killed three people and injured 23 others, asking the question, "I still believe in global warming, do you?" They withdrew the billboards a day later. The institute planned for the campaign to feature murderer Charles Manson, communist leader Fidel Castro and perhaps Osama bin Laden, asking the same question. The institute justified the billboards saying "the most prominent advocates of global warming aren't scientists. They are murderers, tyrants, and madmen."

The billboard reportedly "unleashed a social media-fed campaign, including a petition from the advocacy group Forecast the Facts calling on Heartland's corporate backers to immediately pull their funding," and prompted Rep. James Sensenbrenner Jr. (R-Wis.) to threaten to cancel his speech at the upcoming seventh International Conference on Climate Change organized by Heartland. Sensenbrenner ultimately did speak at the conference. Within 24 hours Heartland canceled the campaign, although its president refused to apologize for it. (Note: President Joseph Bast issued a statement saying: "We know that our billboard angered and disappointed many of Heartland's friends and supporters, but we hope they understand what we were trying to do with this experiment. We do not apologize for running the ad, and we will continue to experiment with ways to communicate the 'realist' message on the climate.") The advertising campaign led to the resignation of two of the institute's 12 board members, and the resignation of almost the entire Heartland Washington, D.C. office, taking the institute's biggest project (on insurance) with it. The staff of the former Heartland insurance project founded the R Street Institute and announced they "will not promote climate change skepticism."

Following the 2012 document leak and the controversial billboard campaign, substantial funding was lost as corporate donors, including the General Motors Foundation, sought to dissociate themselves from the institute. According to the advocacy group Forecast the Facts, Heartland lost more than $825,000, or one third of planned corporate fundraising for the year. The shortfall led to sponsorship of the institute's May 2012 climate conference by Illinois' coal lobby, the Illinois Coal Association, the institute's "first publicly acknowledged donations from the coal industry," and The Heritage Foundation. The billboard controversy led to the loss of substantial corporate funding, including telecommunications firm AT&T, financial service firm BB&T, alcoholic beverage company Diageo and about two dozen insurance companies, including State Farm and the United Services Automobile Association. Pharmaceutical companies Amgen, Eli Lilly, Bayer and GlaxoSmithKline ended financial support. Heartland's May, 2012, climate conference was smaller than previous years.

==== Repeal of mandates on renewable energy ====
The institute wrote model legislation to repeal mandates on renewable energy, such as solar and wind power, and presented the model legislation to the American Legislative Exchange Council (ALEC), a nonprofit organization of conservative state legislators and private sector representatives that drafts and shares model state-level legislation for distribution among state governments in the United States. ALEC's board of directors adopted the model legislation in October 2012.

==== False endorsement claim ====
In 2013, the Chinese Academy of Sciences published a report from the Heartland Institute in order to better understand the public debate and encourage discussion of other views. The preface included a disclaimer that the academy did not endorse the views in the report, but in June, the institute announced that the Chinese Academy of Sciences supported their views, and said the publication placed significant scientific weight against climate change. The Chinese Academy of Sciences, responding to the announcement, said "The claim of the Heartland Institute about CAS' endorsement of its report is completely false," clarified that they did not endorse the views of the institute, and asked for a retraction.

==== Vatican Council on climate change ====
On April 28, 2015, the Catholic Church convened a council to discuss the religious implications of global warming. Held at the Vatican and hosted by the Vatican's Pontifical Academy of Sciences, it was attended by the Secretary-General of the United Nations, as well as national presidents, CEOs, academics, scientists, and representatives of the world's major religions. The institute sent a delegation in an attempt to present a dissenting opinion. It held a "prebuttal" of the conference and argued that climate science does not justify papal recognition of the United Nations' Intergovernmental Panel on Climate Change.

After the council ended, a representative (Marc Morano) from the institute broke into a press briefing being given by Secretary-General Ban Ki-moon, who was reporting on his meeting with the Pope. He interrupted the Secretary-General and the moderator, asking that global-warming skeptics be allowed to speak. After a few minutes, he was escorted from the premises by Vatican officials. In response to the papal encyclical "Laudato Si'", which outlined the Church's moral case for addressing climate change, and in anticipation of Pope Francis' September 2015 visit to the United States, Gene Koprowski, director of marketing for the institute, suggested that the Pope's pronouncements on climate change indicate that "pagan forms are returning to the Church this day."

==== Mass mailing of unsolicited material to science teachers ====
In March 2017, the institute's program the Center for Transforming Education began an unsolicited mailing of the institute's book Why Scientists Disagree About Global Warming and a companion DVD to all 200,000 K-12 science teachers in the U. S., with a cover letter giving a link to an online course planning guide. "The material is not science and was intended to confuse teachers", according to the National Center for Science Education. Climate scientists who contributed to the fact-checking website Climate Feedback also criticized the book's inaccuracies.

=== Privatization of government services ===
The institute is a critic of current federal, state, and local budgets and tax codes. Several of the institute's budgetary views include privatization of federal services to a competitive marketplace, changing the tax code to a more simplified version of the current code, and implementing Taxpayer Savings Grants.

In 1987, the institute advocated for tenant ownership of the Chicago Housing Authority's Cabrini-Green Homes public housing complex through a cooperative or condominium conversion. In 1990, the institute advocated for lower taxes in Illinois to foster job growth.

The institute advocated for the privatization of Illinois' toll highway system in 1999 and 2000. In 2008, the institute opposed state subsidies and tax credits for local film productions, saying the economic benefits are less than the incentives.

=== Education ===
The institute supports charter schools, education tax credits to attend private schools, and vouchers for low-income students, as well as the Parent Trigger reform that started in California. The institute supports the introduction of market reforms into the public K–12 education system to increase competition.

In 1994, the institute criticized the Chicago Public Schools' reform efforts and advocated privatization of public schools and school vouchers.

=== Healthcare ===
The institute advocates for free-market reforms in healthcare and opposes federal control over the healthcare industry. Heartland supports Health Savings Accounts (HSAs), replacing federal tax deductions for employer-based healthcare with a refundable tax credit to allow individual choice over health insurance, removing state and Federal healthcare regulations aimed at providers and consumers of healthcare, and reducing litigation costs which are associated with malpractice suits.

In 2010, Heartland published the 66 page book The Obamacare Disaster by Peter Ferrara, which opposed the Patient Protection and Affordable Care Act.

In 2015, the institute filed an amicus curiae brief in support of the petitioner in King v. Burwell, a Supreme Court case challenging income tax subsidies to those who enroll in health insurance under the Patient Protection and Affordable Care Act via the federal as opposed to the state health insurance exchanges.

=== Hydraulic fracturing ===
The institute advocates for hydraulic fracturing (aka "fracking"), a well-stimulation technique in which rock is fractured by pressurized liquids, publishing essays in support of fracking in various national newspapers. On March 20, 2015, Heartland's science director defended hydraulic fracturing on the Your World With Neil Cavuto program on Fox News.

== Funding ==
According to its brochures, Heartland receives money from approximately 5,000 individuals and organizations, and no single corporate entity donates more than 5% of the operating budget, although the figure for individual donors can be much higher, with a single anonymous donor providing $4.6 million in 2008, and $979,000 in 2011, accounting for 20% of Heartland's overall budget, according to reports of a leaked fundraising plan. Heartland states that it does not accept government funds and does not conduct contract research for special-interest groups.

Oil and gas companies have contributed to the institute, including $736,500 from ExxonMobil between 1998 and 2005. Greenpeace reported that Heartland received almost $800,000 from ExxonMobil. In 2008, ExxonMobil said that it would stop funding to groups skeptical of climate change, including Heartland. Institute president Bast argued that ExxonMobil was simply distancing itself from Heartland out of concern for its public image.

The institute has also received funding and support from tobacco companies Philip Morris, Altria and Reynolds American, and pharmaceutical industry firms GlaxoSmithKline, Pfizer and Eli Lilly. State Farm Insurance, USAA and Diageo are former supporters. The Independent reported that Heartland's receipt of donations from Exxon and Philip Morris indicates a "direct link...between anti-global warming sceptics funded by the oil industry and the opponents of the scientific evidence showing that passive smoking can damage people's health." The institute opposes legislation on passive smoking as infringing on personal liberty and the rights of owners of bars and other establishments.

As of 2006, the Walton Family Foundation had contributed approximately $300,000 to Heartland. The institute published an op-ed in the Louisville Courier-Journal defending Wal-Mart against criticism over its treatment of workers. The Walton Family Foundation donations were not disclosed in the op-ed, and the editor of the Courier-Journal stated that he was unaware of the connection and would probably not have published the op-ed had he known of it. The St. Petersburg Times described the institute as "particularly energetic defending Wal-Mart." Heartland has stated that its authors were not "paid to defend Wal-Mart" and did not receive funding from the corporation; it did not disclose the approximately $300,000 received from the Walton Family Foundation.

In 2010, MediaTransparency said that Heartland received funding from politically conservative foundations such as the Castle Rock Foundation, the Sarah Scaife Foundation, the John M. Olin Foundation, and the Lynde and Harry Bradley Foundation. Between 2002 and 2010, Donors Trust, a nonprofit donor-advised fund, granted $13.5 million to the institute. In 2011, the institute received $25,000 from the Charles G. Koch Charitable Foundation. The Charles Koch Foundation states that the contribution was "$25,000 to the Heartland Institute in 2011 for research in healthcare, not climate change, and this was the first and only donation the Foundation made to the institute in more than a decade".

In 2012, a large number of sponsors withdrew funding due to the 2012 documents incident and the controversy over their billboard campaign. The institute lost an estimated $825,000, or one third of planned corporate fundraising for the year.

In 2022, ProPublica reported that Steve Baer had said Barre Seid was "the major patron" for the Heartland Institute.

== 2012 documents leak ==
On February 14, 2012, the global warming blog DeSmogBlog published more than one hundred pages of documents said to be from the institute. Heartland acknowledged that some internal documents had been stolen, but said that one, the "Climate Strategy memo", was forged to discredit Heartland.

The documents were initially anonymously sourced, but later found to have been obtained by climate scientist Peter Gleick. The documents included a fundraising plan, board of directors meeting minutes, and the organization's 2012 budget. The documents were analyzed by major media, including The New York Times, The Guardian, United Press International and the Associated Press. Donors to the institute included the Charles G. Koch Charitable Foundation, Microsoft, General Motors, Comcast, Reynolds American, Philip Morris, Amgen, Bayer, GlaxoSmithKline, Pfizer and Eli Lilly, liquor companies, and an anonymous donor who had given $13 million over the past five years.

The documents contained details of payments to support climate change deniers and their programs, namely the founder of the Center for the Study of Carbon Dioxide and Global Change, Craig Idso ($11,600 per month), physicist Fred Singer ($5,000 plus expenses per month), geologist Robert M. Carter ($1,667 per month) and $90,000 to blogger and former meteorologist Anthony Watts. The documents also revealed the institute's plan to develop curriculum materials to be provided to teachers in the United States to promote climate skepticism, plans confirmed by the Associated Press. The documents also disclosed Heartland's $612,000 plan to support Wisconsin Act 10 and to influence the Wisconsin's recall elections called "Operation Angry Badger." Carter and Watts confirmed receiving payments.

Microsoft said its donation had taken the form of gratis software licenses, which it was issuing to all nonprofits, and Glaxo said their donation was for "a healthcare initiative" and they did not support Heartland's views on climate change. Several environmental organizations called on General Motors and Microsoft to sever their ties with Heartland. Climate scientists called on Heartland to "recognise how its attacks on science and scientists have poisoned the debate about climate change policy."

Gleick described his actions in obtaining the documents as "a serious lapse of my own and professional judgment and ethics" and said that he "deeply regret[ted his] own actions in this case". He stated that "My judgment was blinded by my frustration with the ongoing efforts—often anonymous, well-funded, and coordinated—to attack climate science and scientists and prevent this debate, and by the lack of transparency of the organizations involved." On February 24, he wrote to the board of the Pacific Institute requesting a "temporary short-term leave of absence" from the institute. The board of directors stated it was "deeply concerned regarding recent events" involving Gleick and the Heartland documents, and appointed a new Acting Executive Director on February 27. Gleick was later reinstated to the Pacific Institute after an investigation found Gleick did not forge any documents, and he apologized for using deception to acquire the documents.

== Publications ==
Books

- Bast, Joseph L. (2006). Please Don't Poop in My Salad. Chicago. ISBN 978-0978695903.
- Bast, Joseph L.; Gilder, George; Gilroy, Leonard; Glans, Matthew; Haney, Hance; Lehrer, Eli; Moore, Adrian; Stanek, Steve; Vedder, Richard; Walberg, Herbert J. (2010). The Patriot's Toolbox: Eighty Principles for Restoring Our Freedom and Prosperity. Heartland Institute. ISBN 978-1934791332.
- Idso, Craig Douglas; Singer, S. Fred (2009). Climate change reconsidered: 2009 report of the Nongovernmental International Panel on Climate Change. Nongovernmental International Panel on Climate Change. ISBN 978-1934791288.
- Singer, S. Fred (2008). Nature, not human activity, rules the climate. Heartland Institute. ISBN 978-1934791011.
- Watts, Anthony (2009). Is the US surface temperature record reliable?. Heartland Institute. ISBN 978-1934791295.

== See also ==
- Tea Party movement
- American Legislative Exchange Council
