= Fred Singer =

Austrian-born American physicist (1924–2020)

S. Fred Singer
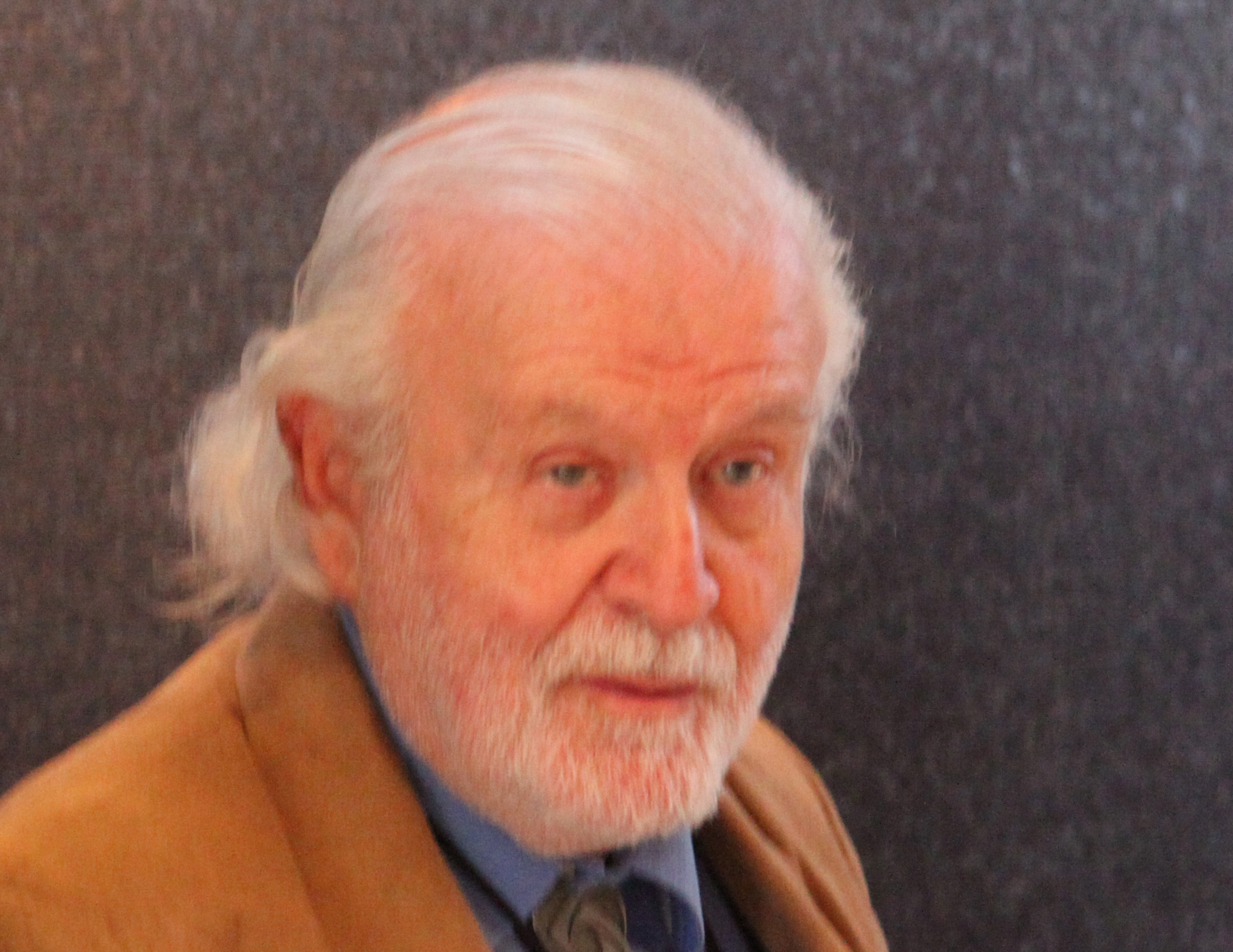
- Singer in 2011
- Born: September 27, 1924; Vienna, Austria
- Died: April 6, 2020 (aged 95); Rockville, Maryland, U.S.
- Education: Ohio State University, Princeton University
- Occupation: Physicist
- Organization(s): Professor emeritus of environmental science, University of Virginia; Founder and president, Science & Environmental Policy Project
- Known for: Early space research; first director of the U.S. National Weather Satellite Service (1962–1964); involvement in global warming controversy

Siegfried Fred Singer (September 27, 1924 – April 6, 2020) was an Austrian-born American physicist and emeritus professor of environmental science at the University of Virginia, trained as an atmospheric physicist. He was known for rejecting the scientific consensus on several issues, including climate change, the connection between UV-B exposure and melanoma rates, stratospheric ozone loss being caused by chlorofluoro compounds, often used as refrigerants, and the health risks of passive smoking.

He is the author or editor of several books, including Global Effects of Environmental Pollution (1970), The Ocean in Human Affairs (1989), Global Climate Change (1989), The Greenhouse Debate Continued (1992), and Hot Talk, Cold Science (1997). He also co-authored Unstoppable Global Warming: Every 1,500 Years (2007) with Dennis Avery, and Climate Change Reconsidered (2009) with Craig Idso.

Singer had a varied career, serving in the armed forces, government, and academia. He designed mines for the U.S. Navy during World War II, before obtaining his Ph.D. in physics from Princeton University in 1948 and working as a scientific liaison officer in the U.S. Embassy in London. He became a leading figure in early space research, was involved in the development of earth observation satellites, and in 1962 established the National Weather Bureau's Satellite Service Center. He was the founding dean of the University of Miami School of Environmental and Planetary Sciences in 1964, and held several government positions, including deputy assistant administrator for the Environmental Protection Agency, and chief scientist for the Department of Transportation. He held a professorship with the University of Virginia from 1971 until 1994, and with George Mason University until 2000.

In 1990 Singer founded the Science & Environmental Policy Project, and in 2006 was named by the Canadian Broadcasting Corporation as one of a minority of scientists said to be creating a stand-off on a consensus on climate change. Singer argued, contrary to the scientific consensus on climate change, that there is no evidence that global warming is attributable to human-caused increases in atmospheric carbon dioxide, and that humanity would benefit if temperatures do rise. He was an opponent of the Kyoto Protocol, and claimed that climate models are not based on reality or evidence. Singer was accused of rejecting peer-reviewed and independently confirmed scientific evidence in his claims concerning public health and environmental issues.

== Early life and education ==
Singer was born in Vienna, Austria, to a Jewish family. His father was a jeweler and his mother a homemaker. Following the Anschluss between Nazi Germany and Austria in 1938, the family fled Austria, and Singer departed on a children's transport train with other Jewish children. He ended up in England, where he lived in Northumberland, working for a time as a teenage optician. Several years later he emigrated to Ohio and became an American citizen in 1944. He received a Bachelor of Electrical Engineering (B.E.E.) from Ohio State University in 1943. He taught physics at Princeton while he worked on his masters and his doctorate, obtaining his Ph.D. there in 1948. His doctoral thesis was titled, "The density spectrum and latitude dependence of extensive cosmic ray air showers." His supervisor was John Archibald Wheeler, and his thesis committee included J. Robert Oppenheimer and Niels Bohr.

== Career ==
=== 1950: United States Navy ===
After his masters, Singer joined the armed forces, working for the United States Navy on mine warfare and countermeasures from 1944 until 1946. While with the Naval Ordnance Laboratory he developed an arithmetic element for an electronic digital calculator that he called an "electronic brain". He was discharged in 1946 and joined the Upper Atmosphere Rocket Program at the Johns Hopkins University Applied Physics Laboratory in Silver Spring, Maryland, working there until 1950. He focused on ozone, cosmic rays, and the ionosphere, all measured using balloons and rockets launched from White Sands, New Mexico, or from ships out at sea. Rachel White Scheuering writes that for one mission to launch a rocket, he sailed with a naval operation to the Arctic, and also conducted rocket launching from ships at the equator.

From 1950 to 1953, he was attached to the U.S. Embassy in London as a scientific liaison officer with the Office of Naval Research, where he studied research programs in Europe into cosmic radiation and nuclear physics. While there, he was one of eight delegates with a background in guided weapons projects to address the Fourth International Congress of Astronautics in Zurich in August 1953, at a time when, as The New York Times reported, most scientists saw space flight as thinly disguised science fiction.

=== 1951: Design of early satellites ===
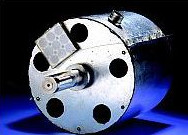
Singer's MOUSE satellite, which he designed in the early 1950s

Singer was one of the first scientists to urge the launching of Earth satellites for scientific observation during the 1950s. In 1951 or 1952 he proposed the MOUSE ("Minimal Orbital Unmanned Satellite, Earth"), a 100 pounds (45 kg) satellite that would contain Geiger counters for measuring cosmic rays, photo cells for scanning the Earth, telemetry electronics for sending data back to Earth, a magnetic data storage device, and rudimentary solar energy cells. Although MOUSE never flew, the Baltimore News-Post reported in 1957 that had Singer's arguments about the need for satellites been heeded, the U.S. could have beaten Russia by launching the first Earth satellite. He also proposed (along with R. C. Wentworth) that satellite measurement of ultraviolet backscatter could be used as a method to measure atmospheric ozone profiles. This technique was later used on early weather satellites.

=== 1953: University of Maryland ===
Singer moved back to the United States in 1953, where he took up an associate professorship in physics at the University of Maryland, and at the same time served as the director of the Center for Atmospheric and Space Physics. Scheuering writes that his work involved conducting experiments on rockets and satellites, remote sensing, radiation belts, the magnetosphere, and meteorites. He developed a new method of launching rockets into space: firing them from a high-flying plane, both with and without a pilot. The Navy adopted the idea and Singer supervised the project. He received a White House Special Commendation from President Eisenhower in 1954 for his work.

He became one of 12 board members of the American Astronautical Society, an organization formed in 1954 to represent the country's 300 leading scientists and engineers in the area of guided missiles—he was one of seven members of the board to resign in December 1956 after a series of disputes about the direction and control of the group.

In November 1957 Singer and other scientists at the university successfully designed and fired three new "Oriole" rockets off the Virginia Capes. The rockets weighed less than 25 pounds (11 kg) and could be built for around $2000. Fired from a converted Navy LSM, they could reach an altitude of 50,000 feet (15,000 m) and had a complete telemetry system to send back information on cosmic, ultraviolet and X-rays. Singer said that the firings placed "the exploration of outer space with high altitude rockets on the same basis, cost-wise and effort-wise, as low atmosphere measurements with weather balloons. From now on, we can fire thousands of these rockets all over the world with very little cost."

In February 1958, when he was head of the cosmic ray group of the University of Maryland's physics department, he received a special commendation from President Eisenhower for "outstanding achievements in the development of satellites for scientific purposes." In April 1958, he was appointed as a consultant to the House Select Committee on Astronautics and Space Exploration, which was preparing to hold hearings on President Eisenhower's proposal for a new agency to handle space research, and a month later received the Ohio State University's Distinguished Alumnus Award. He became a full professor at Maryland in 1959, and was chosen that year by the United States Junior Chamber of Commerce as one of the country's ten outstanding young men.

In a January 1960 presentation to the American Physical Society, Singer sketched out his vision of what the environment around the Earth might consist of, extending up to 40,000 miles (64,000 km) into space. He became known for his early predictions about the properties of the electrical particles trapped around the Earth, which were partly verified by later discoveries in satellite experiments. In December 1960, he suggested the existence of a shell of visible dust particles around the Earth some 600 to 1,000 miles (1,600 km) in space, beyond which there was a layer of smaller particles, a micrometre or less in diameter, extending 2,000 to 4,000 miles (6,400 km). In March 1961 Singer and another University of Maryland physicist, E. J. Opik, were given a $97,000 grant by NASA to conduct a three-year study of interplanetary gas and dust.

=== 1960: Artificial Phobos hypothesis ===
In a 1960 Astronautics newsletter, Singer commented on Iosif Shklovsky's hypothesis that the orbit of the Martian moon Phobos suggests that it is hollow, which implies it is of artificial origin. Singer wrote: "My conclusion there is, and here I back Shklovsky, that if the satellite is indeed spiraling inward as deduced from astronomical observation, then there is little alternative to the hypothesis that it is hollow and therefore martian made. The big 'if' lies in the astronomical observations; they may well be in error. Since they are based on several independent sets of measurements taken decades apart by different observers with different instruments, systematic errors may have influenced them." Later measurements confirmed Singer's big "if" caveat: Shklovsky overestimated Phobos' rate of altitude loss due to bad early data. Photographs by probes beginning in 1972 show a natural stony surface with craters. Ufologists continue to present Singer as an unconditional supporter of Shklovsky's artificial Phobos hypothesis.

Time magazine wrote in 1969 that Singer had had a lifelong fascination with Phobos and Mars's second moon, Deimos. He told Time it might be possible to pull Deimos into the Earth's orbit so it could be examined. During an international space symposium in May 1966, attended by space scientists from the United States and Soviet Union, he first proposed that crewed landings on the Martian moons would be a logical step after a crewed landing on the Earth's Moon. He pointed out that the very small sizes of Phobos and Deimos—approximately fourteen and eight miles (23 and 13 km) in diameter and sub milli-g surface gravity—would make it easier for a spacecraft to land and take off again.

=== 1962: National Weather Center and University of Miami ===
In 1962, on leave from the university, Singer was named as the first director of meteorological satellite services for the National Weather Satellite Center, now part of the National Oceanic and Atmospheric Administration, and directed a program for using satellites to forecast the weather. He stayed there until 1964. He told Time magazine in 1969 that he enjoyed moving around. "Each move gave me a completely new perspective," he said. "If I had sat still, I'd probably still be measuring cosmic rays, the subject of my thesis at Princeton. That's what happens to most scientists." When he stepped down as director he received a Department of Commerce Gold Medal award for Distinguished Federal Service.

In 1964, he became the first dean of the School of Environmental and Planetary Sciences at the University of Miami in 1964, the first school of its kind in the country, dedicated to space-age research. In December 1965, The New York Times reported on a conference Singer hosted in Miami Beach during which five groups of scientists, working independently, presented research identifying what they believed was the remains of a primordial flash that occurred when the universe was born.

=== 1967–1994 ===
In 1967 he accepted the position of deputy assistant secretary with the U.S. Department of the Interior, where he was in charge of water quality and research. When the U.S. Environmental Protection Agency was created on 1970, he became its deputy assistant administrator of policy.

Singer accepted a professorship in Environmental Sciences at the University of Virginia in 1971, a position he held until 1994, where he taught classes on environmental issues such as ozone depletion, acid rain, climate change, population growth, and public policy issues related to oil and energy. In 1987 he took up a two-year post as chief scientist at the U.S. Department of Transportation, and in 1989 joined the Institute of Space Science and Technology in Gainesville, Florida where he contributed to a paper on the results from the Interplanetary Dust Experiment using data from the Long Duration Exposure Facility satellite. When he retired from Virginia in 1994, he became Distinguished Research Professor at the Institute for Humane Studies at George Mason University until 2000.

Naomi Oreskes and Erik Conway say that Singer was involved in the Reagan administration's efforts to prevent regulatory action to reduce acid rain.

== Public debates ==
=== Writing ===
Throughout his academic career Singer wrote frequently in the mainstream press, including The New York Times, The Washington Post, and Wall Street Journal, often striking up positions disputing mainstream thinking. His overall position was one of distrust of federal regulations and a strong belief in the efficacy of the free market. He believed in what Rachel White Scheuering calls "free-market environmentalism": that market principles and incentives should be sufficient to lead to the protection of the environment and conservation of resources. Regular themes in his articles have been energy, oil embargoes, OPEC, Iran, and rising prices. Throughout the 1970s, for example, he downplayed the idea of an energy crisis and said it was largely a media event. In several papers in the 1990s and 2000s he struck up other positions against the mainstream, questioning the link between UV-B and melanoma rates, and that between CFCs and stratospheric ozone loss.

In October 1967, Singer wrote an article for The Washington Post from the perspective of 2007. His predictions included that planets had been explored but not colonized, and although rockets had become more powerful they had not replaced aircraft and ramjet vehicles. None of the fundamental laws of physics had been overturned. There was increased reliance on the electronic computer and data processor; the most exciting development was the increase in human intellect by direct electronic storage of information in the brain—the coupling of the brain to an external computer, thereby gaining direct access to an information library.

He debated the astronomer Carl Sagan on ABC's Nightline, regarding the possible environmental effects of the Kuwaiti oil fires. Sagan argued that if enough fire-fighting teams were not assembled in short order, and if many fires were left to burn over a period of months to possibly a year, the smoke might loft into the upper atmosphere and lead to massive agricultural failures over South Asia. Singer argued that it would rise to 3,000 feet (910 m) then be rained out after a few days. In fact, both Sagan and Singer were incorrect; smoke plumes from the fires rose to 10,000–12,000 feet and lingered for nearly a month, but despite absorbing 75–80% of the sun's radiation in the Persian Gulf area the plumes had little global effect.

The public debates in which Singer received most criticism have been about second-hand smoke and global warming. He questioned the link between second-hand smoke and lung cancer, and was an outspoken opponent of the mainstream scientific view on climate change; he argued there is no evidence that increases in carbon dioxide produced by human beings is causing global warming and that the temperature of the Earth has always varied. A CBC Fifth Estate documentary in 2006 linked these two debates, naming Singer as a scientist who has acted as a consultant to industry in both areas, either directly or through a public relations firm. Naomi Oreskes and Erik Conway named Singer in their book, Merchants of Doubt, as one of three contrarian physicists—along with Fred Seitz and Bill Nierenberg—who regularly injected themselves into the public debate about contentious scientific issues, positioning themselves as skeptics, their views gaining traction because the media gives them equal time out of a sense of fairness.

=== Second-hand smoke ===
According to David Biello and John Pavlus in Scientific American, Singer was best known for his denial of the health risks of passive smoking. He was involved in 1994 as writer and reviewer of a report on the issue by the Alexis de Tocqueville Institution, where he was a senior fellow. The report criticized the Environmental Protection Agency (EPA) for their 1993 study about the cancer risks of passive smoking, calling it "junk science". Singer told CBC's The Fifth Estate in 2006 that he stood by the position that the EPA had "cooked the data" to show that second-hand smoke causes lung cancer. CBC said that tobacco money had paid for Singer's research and for his promotion of it, and that it was organized by APCO. Singer told CBC it made no difference where the money came from. "They don't carry a note on a dollar bill saying 'This comes from the tobacco industry,'" he said. "In any case I was not aware of it, and I didn't ask APCO where they get their money. That's not my business."

=== Global warming ===
In a 2003 letter to the Financial Times, Singer wrote that "there is no convincing evidence that the global climate is actually warming." In 2006, the CBC's Fifth Estate named Singer as one of a small group of scientists who have created what the documentary called a stand-off that is undermining the political response to global warming. The following year he appeared on the British Channel 4 documentary The Great Global Warming Swindle. Singer argues there is no evidence that the increases in carbon dioxide produced by humans cause global warming, and that if temperatures do rise it will be good for humankind. He told CBC: "It was warmer a thousand years ago than it is today. Vikings settled Greenland. Is that good or bad? I think it's good. They grew wine in England, in northern England. I think that's good. At least some people think so." "We are certainly putting more carbon dioxide in the atmosphere," he told The Daily Telegraph in 2009. "However there is no evidence that this high CO_{2} is making a detectable difference. It should in principle, however the atmosphere is very complicated and one cannot simply argue that just because CO_{2} is a greenhouse gas it causes warming." He believes that radical environmentalists are exaggerating the dangers. "The underlying effort here seems to be to use global warming as an excuse to cut down the use of energy," he said. "It's very simple: if you cut back the use of energy, then you cut back economic growth. And believe it or not, there are people in the world who believe we have gone too far in economic growth."

Singers's opinions conflict with the scientific consensus on climate change, where there is overwhelming consensus for anthropogenic global warming, and a decisive link between carbon dioxide concentration and global average temperatures, as well as consensus that such a change to the climate will have dangerous consequences. In 2005, Mother Jones magazine described Singer as a "godfather of global warming denial." However, Singer characterized himself as a "skeptic" rather than a "denier" of global climate change.

==== SEPP and funding ====
In 1990 Singer set up the Science & Environmental Policy Project (SEPP) to argue against preventive measures against global warming. After the 1991 United Nations Conference on Environment and Development, the Earth Summit, Singer started writing and speaking out to cast doubt on the science. He predicted disastrous economic damage from any restrictions on fossil fuel use, and argued that the natural world and its weather patterns are complex and ill-understood, and that little is known about the dynamics of heat exchange from the oceans to the atmosphere, or the role of clouds. As the scientific consensus grew, he continued to argue from a dismissive position. He has repeatedly criticized the climate models that predict global warming. In 1994 he compared model results to observed temperatures and found that the predicted temperatures for 1950–1980 deviated from the temperatures that had actually occurred, from which he concluded in his regular column in The Washington Times—with the headline that day "Climate Claims Wither under the Luminous Lights of Science"—that climate models are faulty. In 2007 he collaborated on a study that found tropospheric temperature trends of "Climate of the 20th Century" models differed from satellite observations by twice the model mean uncertainty.

Rachel White Scheuering writes that, when SEPP began, it was affiliated with the Washington Institute for Values in Public Policy, a think tank founded by Unification Church leader Sun Myung Moon. A 1990 article for the Cato Institute identifies Singer as the director of the science and environmental policy project at the Washington Institute for Values in Public Policy, on leave from the University of Virginia. Scheuering writes that Singer had cut ties with the institute, and was funded by foundations and oil companies. She writes that he was a paid consultant for many years for ARCO, ExxonMobil, Shell, Sun Oil Company, and Unocal, and that SEPP had received grants from ExxonMobil. Singer said his financial relationships did not influence his research. Scheuering argues that his conclusions concur with the economic interests of the companies that pay him, in that the companies want to see a reduction in environmental regulation.

In August 2007 Newsweek reported that in April 1998 a dozen people from what it called "the denial machine" met at the American Petroleum Institute's Washington headquarters. The meeting included Singer's group, the George C. Marshall Institute, and ExxonMobil. Newsweek said that, according to an eight-page memo that was leaked, the meeting proposed a $5-million campaign to convince the public that the science of global warming was controversial and uncertain. The plan was leaked to the press and never implemented. The week after the story, Newsweek published a contrary view from Robert Samuelson, one of its columnists, who said the story of an industry-funded denial machine was contrived and fundamentally misleading. ABC News reported in March 2008 that Singer said he is not on the payroll of the energy industry, but he acknowledged that SEPP had received one unsolicited charitable donation of $10,000 from ExxonMobil, and that it was one percent of all donations received. Singer said that his connection to Exxon was more like being on their mailing list than holding a paid position. The relationships have discredited Singer's research among members of the scientific community, according to Scheuering. Congresswoman Lynn Rivers questioned Singer's credibility during a congressional hearing in 1995, saying he had not been able to publish anything in a peer-reviewed scientific journal for the previous 15 years, except for one technical comment.

==== Criticism of the IPCC ====
In 1995 the Intergovernmental Panel on Climate Change (IPCC) issued a report reflecting the scientific consensus that the balance of evidence suggests there is a discernible human influence on global climate. Singer responded with a letter to Science saying the IPCC report had presented material selectively. He wrote: "the Summary does not even mention the existence of 18 years of weather satellite data that show a slight global cooling trend, contradicting all theoretical models of climate warming." Scheuering writes that Singer acknowledges the surface thermometers from weather stations show warming, but he argues that the satellites provide better data because their measurements cover pole to pole. According to Edward Parson and Andrew Dessler, the satellite data did not show surface temperatures directly, but had to be adjusted using models. When adjustment was made for transient events the data showed a slight warming, and research suggested that the discrepancy between surface and satellite data was largely accounted for by problems such as instrument differences between satellites.

Singer wrote the "Leipzig Declaration on Global Climate Change in the U.S." in 1995, updating it in 1997 to rebut the Kyoto Protocol. The Kyoto Protocol was the result of an international convention held in Kyoto, Japan, during which several industrialized nations agreed to reduce their greenhouse gas emissions. Singer's declaration read: "Energy is essential for economic growth ... We understand the motivation to eliminate what are perceived to be the driving forces behind a potential climate change; but we believe the Kyoto Protocol—to curtail carbon dioxide emissions from only a part of the world community—is dangerously simplistic, quite ineffective, and economically destructive to jobs and standards-of-living."

Scheuering writes that Singer circulated this in the United States and Europe and gathered 100 signatories, though she says some of the signatories' credentials were questioned. At least 20 were television weather reporters, some did not have science degrees, and 14 were listed as professors without specifying a field. According to Scheuering, some of them later said they believed they were signing a document in favour of action against climate change.

Singer set up the Nongovernmental International Panel on Climate Change (NIPCC) in 2004 after the 2003 United Nations Climate Change Conference in Milan. NIPCC organized an international climate workshop in Vienna in April 2007, to provide what they called an independent examination of the evidence for climate change. Singer prepared an NIPCC report called "Nature, Not Human Activity, Rules the Climate," published in March 2008 by the Heartland Institute, a conservative think tank. ABC News said the same month that unnamed climate scientists from NASA, Stanford, and Princeton who spoke to ABC about the report dismissed it as "fabricated nonsense". In a letter of complaint to ABC News, Singer said their piece used "prejudicial language, distorted facts, libelous insinuations, and anonymous smears".

On September 18, 2013, the NIPCC's fourth report, entitled Climate Change Reconsidered II: Physical Science, was published. As with previous NIPCC reports, environmentalists criticized it upon its publication; for example, David Suzuki wrote that it was "full of long-discredited claims, including that carbon dioxide emissions are good because they stimulate life". After the report received favorable coverage from Fox News Channel's Doug McKelway, climate scientists Kevin Trenberth and Michael Oppenheimer criticized this coverage, with Trenberth calling it "irresponsible journalism" and Oppenheimer calling it "flat out wrong".

==== Climategate ====
In December 2009, after the Climatic Research Unit email controversy, Singer wrote an opinion piece for Reuters in which he claimed the scientists had misused peer review, pressured editors to prevent publication of alternative views, and smeared opponents. He also claimed the leaked e-mails showed that the "surface temperature data that IPCC relies on is based on distorted raw data and algorithms that they will not share with the science community." He argued that the incident exposed a flawed process, and that the temperature trends were heading downwards even as greenhouse gases like CO_{2} were increasing in the atmosphere. He wrote: "This negative correlation contradicts the results of the models that IPCC relies on and indicates that anthropogenic global warming (AGW) is quite small," concluding "and now it turns out that global warming might have been 'man made' after all." A British House of Commons Science and Technology Select Committee later issued a report that exonerated the scientists, and eight committees investigated the allegations, finding no evidence of fraud or scientific misconduct.

== Death ==
On April 6, 2020, Singer died in a nursing home in Rockville, Maryland.

== Selected publications ==
- Global Effects of Environmental Pollution (Reidel, 1970)
- Manned Laboratories in Space (Reidel, 1970)
- Is There an Optimum Level of Population? (McGraw-Hill, 1971)
- The Changing Global Environment (Reidel, 1975)
- Arid Zone Development (Ballinger, 1977)
- Economic Effects of Demographic Changes (Joint Economic Committee, U.S. Congress, 1977)
- Cost-Benefit Analysis in Environmental Decisionmaking (Mitre Corp, 1979)
- Energy (W.H. Freeman, 1979)
- The Price of World Oil (Annual Review of Energy, Vol. 8, 1983)
- Free Market Energy (Universe Books, 1984)
- Oil Policy in a Changing Market (Annual Review of Energy, Vol. 12, 1987)
- The Ocean in Human Affairs (Paragon House, 1989)
- The Universe and Its Origin: From Ancient Myths to Present Reality and Future Fantasy (Paragon House, 1990)
- Global Climate Change: Human and Natural Influences (Paragon House, 1989)
- The Greenhouse Debate Continued (ICS Press, 1992)
- The Scientific Case Against the Global Climate Treaty (SEPP, 1997)
- Hot Talk, Cold Science: Global Warming's Unfinished Debate (The Independent Institute, 1997)
- with Dennis Avery. Unstoppable Global Warming: Every 1500 Years (Rowman & Littlefield, 2007)
- with Craig Idso. Climate Change Reconsidered: 2009 Report of the Nongovernmental International Panel on Climate Change (NIPCC) (2009).

== See also ==
- Fringe science
- Second-hand smoke
- The Power of Big Oil
