= Rastatt (Bundestag electoral district) =

Electoral constituency in Germany

273 Rastatt
- Electoral district for the Bundestag
- Rastatt in 2025
- State: Baden-Württemberg
- Population: 286,600 (2019)
- Electorate: 204,890 (2021)
- Major settlements: Baden-Baden; Rastatt; Gaggenau
- Area: 878.6 km^{2}

Current electoral district
- Created: 1949
- Party: CDU
- Member: Kai Whittaker
- Elected: 2013, 2017, 2021, 2025

Rastatt is an electoral constituency (German: Wahlkreis) represented in the Bundestag. It elects one member via first-past-the-post voting. Under the current constituency numbering system, it is designated as constituency 273. It is located in western Baden-Württemberg, comprising the city of Baden-Baden and the district of Rastatt.

Rastatt was created for the inaugural 1949 federal election. Since 2013, it has been represented by Kai Whittaker of the Christian Democratic Union (CDU).

== Geography ==
Rastatt is located in western Baden-Württemberg. As of the 2021 federal election, it comprises the independent city of Baden-Baden and the district of Rastatt.

== History ==
Rastatt was created in 1949. In the 1949 election, it was Baden constituency 7 in the number system. In the 1953 through 1961 elections, it was number 189. In the 1965 through 1976 elections, it was number 193. In the 1980 through 1998 elections, it was number 177. In the 2002 and 2005 elections, it was number 274. Since the 2009 election, it has been number 273.

Originally, the constituency comprised the independent city of Baden-Baden and the districts of Rastatt and Bühl. In the 1980 through 1994 elections, it comprised the city of Baden-Baden, the Rastatt districts, and the municipalities of Ettlingen, Malsch, and Rheinstetten from the Landkreis Karlsruhe district. In the 1998 election, it lost the Rheinstetten municipality. It acquired its current borders in the 2002 election.

Election	No.	Name	Borders
1949	7	Rastatt	Baden-Baden city; Rastatt district; Bühl district
1953	189	Rastatt	Baden-Baden city; Rastatt district; Bühl district
1957	189	Rastatt	Baden-Baden city; Rastatt district; Bühl district
1961	189	Rastatt	Baden-Baden city; Rastatt district; Bühl district
1965	193	Rastatt	Baden-Baden city; Rastatt district; Bühl district
1969	193	Rastatt	Baden-Baden city; Rastatt district; Bühl district
1972	193	Rastatt	Baden-Baden city; Rastatt district; Bühl district
1976	193	Rastatt	Baden-Baden city; Rastatt district; Bühl district
1980	177	Rastatt	Baden-Baden city; Rastatt district; Landkreis Karlsruhe district (only Ettlingen, Malsch, and Rheinstetten municipalities)
1983	177	Rastatt	Baden-Baden city; Rastatt district; Landkreis Karlsruhe district (only Ettlingen, Malsch, and Rheinstetten municipalities)
1987	177	Rastatt	Baden-Baden city; Rastatt district; Landkreis Karlsruhe district (only Ettlingen, Malsch, and Rheinstetten municipalities)
1990	177	Rastatt	Baden-Baden city; Rastatt district; Landkreis Karlsruhe district (only Ettlingen, Malsch, and Rheinstetten municipalities)
1994	177	Rastatt	Baden-Baden city; Rastatt district; Landkreis Karlsruhe district (only Ettlingen, Malsch, and Rheinstetten municipalities)
1998	177	Rastatt	Baden-Baden city; Rastatt district; Landkreis Karlsruhe district (only Ettlingen and Malsch municipalities)
2002	274	Rastatt	Baden-Baden city; Rastatt district
2005	274	Rastatt	Baden-Baden city; Rastatt district
2009	273	Rastatt	Baden-Baden city; Rastatt district
2013	273	Rastatt	Baden-Baden city; Rastatt district
2017	273	Rastatt	Baden-Baden city; Rastatt district
2021	273	Rastatt	Baden-Baden city; Rastatt district
2025	273	Rastatt	Baden-Baden city; Rastatt district

== Members ==
The constituency has been held continuously by the Christian Democratic Union (CDU) since its creation. It was first represented by Wendelin Morgenthaler from 1949 to 1957, followed by Ludwig Kroll for one term. Hugo Hauser was representative from 1961 to 1976, followed by Bernhard Friedmann from 1976 to 1990. Peter Götz then served from 1990 to 2013. Kai Whittaker was elected in 2013, and re-elected in 2017 and 2021.

Election	Member	Party	%
1949	Wendelin Morgenthaler	CDU	59.5
1953	Wendelin Morgenthaler	CDU	65.4
1957	Ludwig Kroll	CDU	64.9
1961	Hugo Hauser	CDU	57.7
1965	Hugo Hauser	CDU	61.1
1969	Hugo Hauser	CDU	61.0
1972	Hugo Hauser	CDU	58.2
1976	Bernhard Friedmann	CDU	60.1
1980	Bernhard Friedmann	CDU	55.5
1983	Bernhard Friedmann	CDU	61.9
1987	Bernhard Friedmann	CDU	58.4
1990	Peter Götz	CDU	53.5
1994	Peter Götz	CDU	53.4
1998	Peter Götz	CDU	49.3
2002	Peter Götz	CDU	51.0
2005	Peter Götz	CDU	49.3
2009	Peter Götz	CDU	48.0
2013	Kai Whittaker	CDU	53.5
2017	Kai Whittaker	CDU	44.1
2021	Kai Whittaker	CDU	33.2
2025	Kai Whittaker	CDU	33.8

== Election results ==
=== 2025 election ===
Federal election (2025): Rastatt
Notes:	Blue background denotes the winner of the electorate vote. Pink background denotes a candidate elected from their party list. Yellow background denotes an electorate win by a list member, or other incumbent. A ✓ or ✗ denotes status of any incumbent, win or lose respectively.						
Party	Candidate	Votes	%	±%	Party votes	%	±%
CDU	✓ Kai Whittaker	63,111	38.8	▲5.7	54,349	33.4	▲6.4
AfD	Alexander Arpaschi	36,075	22.2	▲11.5	36,771	22.6	▲11.9
SPD	Lukas Hornung	24,570	15.1	▼7.6	14.5	14.5	▼9.2
Greens	Frank Brede	18,275	11.2	▼1.7	17,673	10.8	▼3.4
Left	Lothar Tatzik	7,609	4.7	▲1.9	8,737	5.4	▲2.6
FDP	Dominic Frank	5,727	3.5	▼8.0	8,032	4.9	▼8.9
FW	Raphael Volz	5,410	3.3	▲0.41.9	2,611	1.6	▼0.3
dieBasis	Peter Hank	1,677	1.0	▼1.3	713	0.4	▼1.7
Tierschutzpartei					1,614	1.0	▼0.3
PARTEI					661	0.4	▼0.3
Pirates							▼0.4
Volt				▼0.5	1,021	0.6	▲0.3
Team Todenhöfer							▼0.3
ÖDP					205	0.1	0.0
Gesundheitsforschung							▼0.14
Bürgerbewegung							▼0.4
BD					194	0.1	
Humanists							▼0.1
BSW					6,619	4.1	
Bündnis C					143	0.1	Steady
MLPD					38	0.0	0.0
Informal votes		1,529			1,050		
Total valid votes		162,454			162,933		
Turnout		163,983	81.6	▲5.8			
CDU hold	Majority			▲5.7			

=== 2021 election ===
Federal election (2021): Rastatt
Notes:	Blue background denotes the winner of the electorate vote. Pink background denotes a candidate elected from their party list. Yellow background denotes an electorate win by a list member, or other incumbent. A ✓ or ✗ denotes status of any incumbent, win or lose respectively.						
Party	Candidate	Votes	%	±%	Party votes	%	±%
CDU	✓ Kai Whittaker	50,988	33.2	▼10.9	41,495	27.0	▼10.9
SPD	Gabriele Katzmarek	34,847	22.7	▲3.7	36,442	23.7	▲6.7
Greens	Thomas Gönner	19,962	13.0	▲2.1	21,926	14.3	▲2.8
FDP	Sven Gehrke	17,764	11.6	▲4.4	21,250	13.8	▲2.3
AfD	Verena Bäuerle	16,455	10.7	▼1.5	16,333	10.6	▼2.1
FW	Lara Schindler	4,477	2.9	▲1.1	3,000	2.0	▲1.0
Left	Tudor Costin	4,212	2.7	▼1.9	4,280	2.8	▼2.6
dieBasis	Marion Hofmann	3,557	2.3		3,272	2.1	
Tierschutzpartei					2,026	1.3	▲0.6
PARTEI					1,099	0.7	▲0.1
Pirates					546	0.4	▼0.1
Volt	Robin Gscheidle	772	0.5		492	0.3	
KlimalisteBW	Günther Beikert	486	0.3				
Team Todenhöfer					453	0.3	
ÖDP					199	0.1	0.0
Gesundheitsforschung					187	0.1	
Bürgerbewegung					170	0.1	
NPD					144	0.1	▼0.1
Humanists					132	0.1	
DiB					120	0.1	▼0.1
Bündnis C					101	0.1	
Independent	Wolfgang Rapps	75	0.0				
Bündnis 21					56	0.0	
LKR					35	0.0	
MLPD					25	0.0	0.0
DKP					17	0.0	0.0
Informal votes		1,736			1,531		
Total valid votes		153,595			153,800		
Turnout		155,331	75.8	▼0.3			
CDU hold	Majority	16,141	10.5	▼14.6			

=== 2017 election ===
Federal election (2017): Rastatt
Notes:	Blue background denotes the winner of the electorate vote. Pink background denotes a candidate elected from their party list. Yellow background denotes an electorate win by a list member, or other incumbent. A ✓ or ✗ denotes status of any incumbent, win or lose respectively.						
Party	Candidate	Votes	%	±%	Party votes	%	±%
CDU	✓ Kai Whittaker	68,259	44.1	▼9.4	58,798	37.9	▼11.3
SPD	Gabriele Katzmarek	29,486	19.0	▼4.0	26,374	17.0	▼3.6
AfD	Joachim Kuhs	18,849	12.2	▲7.3	19,701	12.7	▲6.9
Greens	Manuel Hummel	16,954	10.9	▲2.5	17,766	11.4	▲2.4
FDP	Rolf Pilarski	11,150	7.2	▲4.1	17,847	11.5	▲5.7
Left	Norbert Maßon	7,123	4.6	▲1.1	8,369	5.4	▲1.2
FW	Eduard Meßmer	2,809	1.8		1,496	1.0	▲0.4
Tierschutzpartei					1,132	0.7	0.0
PARTEI					921	0.6	
Pirates					644	0.4	▼1.6
Tierschutzallianz					385	0.2	
NPD					313	0.2	▼0.8
DM					295	0.2	
ÖDP					266	0.2	0.0
DiB					208	0.1	
Menschliche Welt					195	0.1	
V-Partei³					178	0.1	
BGE					162	0.1	
DIE RECHTE	Marco Buntenbach	148	0.1		111	0.1	
Independent	Peter Rapps	112	0.1				
MLPD					60	0.0	0.0
DKP					27	0.0	
Informal votes		2,318			1,960		
Total valid votes		154,890			155,248		
Turnout		157,208	76.1	▲4.8			
CDU hold	Majority	38,773	25.1	▼5.4			

=== 2013 election ===
Federal election (2013): Rastatt
Notes:	Blue background denotes the winner of the electorate vote. Pink background denotes a candidate elected from their party list. Yellow background denotes an electorate win by a list member, or other incumbent. A ✓ or ✗ denotes status of any incumbent, win or lose respectively.						
Party	Candidate	Votes	%	±%	Party votes	%	±%
CDU	Kai Whittaker	77,850	53.5	▲5.4	71,752	49.2	▲10.3
SPD	Gabriele Katzmarek	33,482	23.0	▼0.3	30,043	20.6	▲1.5
Greens	Jörg Rupp	12,233	8.4	▼2.4	13,223	9.1	▼2.5
AfD	Bernd Kölmel	7,021	4.8		8,397	5.8	
Left	Norbert Maßon	5,073	3.5	▼2.8	6,055	4.1	▼2.9
FDP	Lutz Jäckel	4,527	3.1	▼6.9	8,436	5.8	▼12.0
Pirates	Heinz Kraft	3,058	2.1		2,906	2.0	▲0.2
NPD	Karl-Heinz Pfirrmann	1,642	1.1	▼0.6	1,409	1.0	▼0.2
Tierschutzpartei					1,076	0.7	0.0
Independent	Alois Degler	760	0.5				
FW					751	0.5	
REP					376	0.3	▼0.4
RENTNER					380	0.3	
Volksabstimmung					329	0.2	0.0
ÖDP					280	0.2	▼0.1
PBC					174	0.1	▼0.1
Party of Reason					137	0.1	
PRO					121	0.1	
MLPD					54	0.0	0.0
BIG					46	0.0	
BüSo					12	0.0	0.0
Informal votes		2,513			2,202		
Total valid votes		145,646			145,957		
Turnout		148,159	71.4	▲1.3			
CDU hold	Majority	44,368	30.5	▲5.8			

=== 2009 election ===
Federal election (2009): Rastatt
Notes:	Blue background denotes the winner of the electorate vote. Pink background denotes a candidate elected from their party list. Yellow background denotes an electorate win by a list member, or other incumbent. A ✓ or ✗ denotes status of any incumbent, win or lose respectively.						
Party	Candidate	Votes	%	±%	Party votes	%	±%
CDU	✓ Peter Götz	68,652	48.0	▼1.3	55,806	38.9	▼2.7
SPD	Nicolette Kressl	33,279	23.3	▼11.4	27,376	19.1	▼12.4
Greens	Hans-Peter Behrens	15,404	10.8	▲4.9	16,649	11.6	▲3.2
FDP	Josef Benz	14,235	10.0	▲4.7	25,553	17.8	▲6.8
Left	Norbert Maßon	8,935	6.3	▲2.8	10,093	7.0	▲3.2
Pirates					2,538	1.8	
NPD	Nelly Rühle	2,436	1.7	▲0.2	1,727	1.2	▲0.1
Tierschutzpartei					1,095	0.8	
REP					1,013	0.7	▼0.3
ÖDP					378	0.3	
PBC					348	0.2	▼0.1
DIE VIOLETTEN					321	0.2	
Volksabstimmung					316	0.2	
BüSo					83	0.1	0.0
DVU					81	0.1	
ADM					58	0.0	
MLPD					58	0.0	0.0
Informal votes		3,219			2,667		
Total valid votes		142,941			143,493		
Turnout		146,160	70.0	▼6.4			
CDU hold	Majority	35,373	24.7	▲10.1			

=== 2005 election ===
Federal election (2005):Rastatt
Notes:	Blue background denotes the winner of the electorate vote. Pink background denotes a candidate elected from their party list. Yellow background denotes an electorate win by a list member, or other incumbent. A ✓ or ✗ denotes status of any incumbent, win or lose respectively.						
Party	Candidate	Votes	%	±%	Party votes	%	±%
CDU	✓ Peter Götz	76,326	49.3	▼1.7	64,460	41.6	▼4.8
SPD	Nicolette Kressl	53,604	34.6	▼0.8	48,869	31.5	▼2.3
Greens	Wolfgang Jokerst	9,092	5.9	▼0.3	13,099	8.4	▼0.2
FDP	Jan Rassek	8,105	5.2	▼0.4	17,081	11.0	▲3.6
Left	Bettina Ehler	5,313	3.4	▲2.5	5,931	3.8	▲3.0
NPD	Harald Benesch	2,311	1.5		1,711	1.1	▲0.8
REP					1,539	1.0	0.0
Familie					1,083	0.7	
GRAUEN					633	0.4	▲0.3
PBC					530	0.3	▲0.1
BüSo					107	0.1	
MLPD					89	0.1	
Informal votes		3,648			3,267		
Total valid votes		154,751			155,132		
Turnout		158,399	76.4	▼3.2			
CDU hold	Majority	22,722	14.7				
