= Helmut Metzner =

Helmut Metzner (15 September 1925, Osnabrück, Germany – 20 September 1999, Tübingen, Germany) was a plant physiologist, Professor of Biochemical Plant Physiology at University of Tübingen, the founder of the European Academy of Environmental Affairs and a co-founder of the Weikersheim Think Tank.

== Academic career ==
Metzner studied biology, physics and physical chemistry at the University of Münster and the University of Göttingen. He completed his studies in 1950 with a dissertation on the subject of "Elektrochemische Messungen an ungereizten Pflanzenzellen" (Electro-chemical measurements of unstimulated plant cells).

He received his doctorate in 1952 from the University of California, Berkeley, having worked under the direction of the pioneering plant biochemist, Melvin Calvin. He subsequently worked as an "Assistent" (postdoctoral fellow) at the Botanical Institute of the University of Münster, where he researched in the field of chloroplasts. After completing his training at the University of Göttingen, he qualified to become a professor with an investigation about "Veränderung der Blattproteine bei photoperiodischer Induktion" (Changes of leaf proteins by photo-periodic induction). He specialised in the biochemistry of photosynthesis.

In 1961, Metzner was offered a professorship at the University of Tübingen, where he became the founding director of the new Institute for Chemical Plant Physiology. In addition to the standard academic program, he also organised adult education courses in Baden-Württemberg as of 1981 on ecology and its biological basis, which were attended by more than 6,000 people. This led to the founding of the European Academy of Environmental Affairs at Tübingen, of which Metzner remained President, until his death in 1999.

Together with Hans Karl Filbinger, Günter Rohrmoser, Heinz Karst and Erich Baumann, Metzner founded the Weikersheim Think Tank in 1979, and he remained a director until 1995. In 1995 he organised a conference in Leipzig, Germany, which produced the Leipzig Declaration on global climate change.

He was editor-in-chief of the journal Photobiochemistry and Photophysics, and co-editor of the journal Photosynthetica.

Metzner became professor emeritus in 1993. He died in 1999 in Tübingen.

== Honors ==
- 1977 Honorary Doctorate of the Ghent University
- 1985 Bundesverdienstkreuz
- 1992 Named as a corresponding member of the Collegium Europaeum Jenense
- 1992 Josef Hlávka Medal of the Czechoslovak Academy of Sciences
