= European Academy of Environmental Affairs =

Private organization

The European Academy for Environmental Affairs (also known as European Academy of Environmental Affairs) is a private organization which cosponsored the 1995 conference that produced the Leipzig Declaration on Global Climate Change, a SEPP-initiated document in which some scientists argue against global warming theories. Founder and president of the Academy was the late Prof. Dr. hc. Helmut Metzner (1925-1999), who was professor for chemical plant physiology. Metzner was accused of having connections to the Studienzentrum Weikersheim, a right-wing think-tank in Baden-Württemberg.

In 1993 the Academy also held a conference in Mannheim under the title "Globale Erwärmung - Tatsache oder Behauptung?" (Global warming-fact or fiction?). The Academy was recognized in a consultative function by the Council of Europe, but the status was withdrawn because of the Academy's failure to comply with its obligations.

The Academy has no active web pages, and it may be defunct. A list of textbooks on ecology issued by the Academy is available online.
