= Ronald Fuchs =

American theoretical physicist

- Born: 27 January 1932; Los Angeles, United States
- Died: 10 November 2012 (aged 80); Ames, Iowa, United States
- Resting place: Ames, Iowa
- Education: University of Illinois Urbana-Champaign
- Known for: Kliewer–Fuchs modes
- Scientific career
- Fields: Optics
- Workplaces: Iowa State University
- Thesis: The autoionization of the beta center and the fine structure of the beta-band in sodium-chloride (1957)
- Doctoral advisor: Frederick Seitz

Ronald Fuchs (January 27, 1932 – November 10, 2012) was an American theoretical physicist and professor at Iowa State University. He is recognized for his work on electromagnetic properties of solids, light scattering of small particles and nonlocal optical phenomena.

== Biography ==
Ernest Ronald Fuchs was born in Los Angeles, California in 1932, only child of Swiss-born Ernest Fuchs and Hanna Berta (Herren) Fuchs.

Fuchs graduated from John Muir College, Pasadena, California in 1950, and attended California Institute of Technology (Caltech) on a full scholarship. He graduated as top in his class with a B.S. in physics in 1954. He then pursued graduate studies in physics at the University of Illinois Urbana-Champaign, where he earned his M.S. in 1955 and his PhD in 1957. His PhD thesis focused on the absorption of light of alkali metal halides, under the supervision of Frederick Seitz.

After completing his doctoral studies, Fuchs worked as a Fulbright Scholar with a National Science Foundation Fellowship at the University of Stuttgart, Germany, and later worked at the Massachusetts Institute of Technology (MIT) Laboratory for Insulation Research from 1958 to 1961.

In 1961, Fuchs joined the faculty of the Iowa State University's department of physics and astronomy as an assistant professor. He was promoted to full professorship in 1974 and became emeritus in 1996.

In 1969, he became a fellow of the American Physical Society.

Throughout his career, Fuchs arranged two-year-long faculty leave as visiting professor to Germany. The first was to the Max Planck Institute for Solid State Research from 1973 to 1974, and the second was to the Freie Universitaet Berlin and the Fritz Haber Institute of the Max Planck Society from 1986 to 1987. He also took a year-long Overseas Fellowship at the Cavendish Laboratory at the University of Cambridge in the United Kingdom from 1996 to 1997.

He died in a house in Ames, Iowa, as a consequence of a plasmacytoma.

== Research ==
Fuchs worked on the theory of the optical properties and non-local effects of metals and insulators, including thin films, small particles, rough surfaces, and disordered systems. He also worked on surface reflectance spectroscopy and electron energy loss spectroscopy of inhomogeneous systems.

The theory of Kliewer–Fuchs modes, related to vibrational modes found on the surface of insulating crystals, was developed by Fuchs and Kenneth Lee Kliewer in 1965. Fuchs developed the theory of surface modes in ionic crystal cubes exposed to a uniform electric fields.

== Awards and honors ==
- For his 75th birthday, a conference was held in Puebla, Mexico in 2007 to honor Fuchs "in recognition for his contributions to nonlocal optics and optical properties of small particles and his fruitful collaborations with Latin American physicists".
- He was given the American Physical Society recognition for Outstanding Referees in 2009.
