= Weikersheim Palace =

Palace in Baden-Württemberg, Germany

Coordinates: 49°28′50″N 9°53′45″E

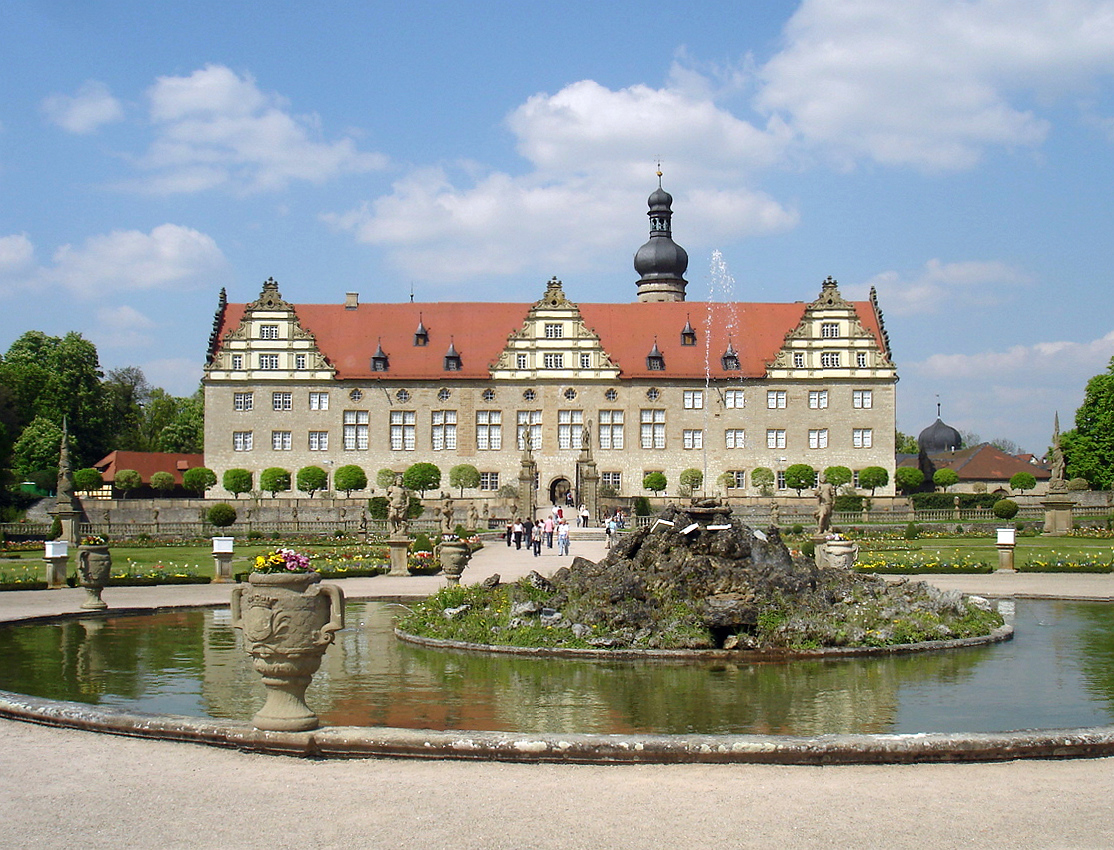
The palace

Weikersheim Palace (German: Schloss Weikersheim) is a palace in Weikersheim, Baden-Württemberg, Germany. It was a medieval seat and later a Renaissance residence of the princely House of Hohenlohe.

== History ==
The castle was built in the 12th century as the first seat of the Lords of Hohenlohe. The exact year is not known, however the first mentioned family member was Conrad of Weikersheim in 1153. The family soon built further castles nearby, Hohlach (to become Hohenlohe) and Brauneck.

In 1586, three brothers divided the Protestant part of the county of Hohenlohe, with their main seats being Weikersheim, Langenburg and Neuenstein. The following year Wolfgang, Count of Hohenlohe-Weikersheim, moved here and reconstructed the medieval castle into a Renaissance palace, together with his wife Magdalena of Nassau-Dillenburg, a younger sister of William the Silent of Orange. The tall tower, the bergfried, however was kept as a symbol of its history. The new castle was completed in 1605.

When Count Carl Ludwig inherited Weikersheim in 1709, he began to redecorate the apartments and gardens in their preserved baroque forms. When he died around 1760, his lands were divided between the Langenburg and Neuenstein branches.

After World War II, Gottfried, Prince of Hohenlohe-Langenburg, invited his cousin, Prince Constantin (1893-1973), an artist, to live in the castle and the latter restored it to its old glory. He also organized operas and concerts. After Langenburg Castle was heavily damaged by fire in 1963, Prince Kraft was forced to sell Weikersheim Palace to the state of Baden-Württemberg in 1967.

In 1911 a son of Carl Ludwig II, Prince of Hohenlohe-Langenburg (nephew of Queen Victoria) had the hereditary title of Prince of Weikersheim but without the property of the Palace.

Today the palace is a museum, but also home to the Jeunesses Musicales Germany during the summer and the Weikersheim Think Tank, a conservative think tank. It is also used for large gatherings and weddings. Visitors can tour parts of the Renaissance palace and the Baroque garden with many statues.

== Gallery ==
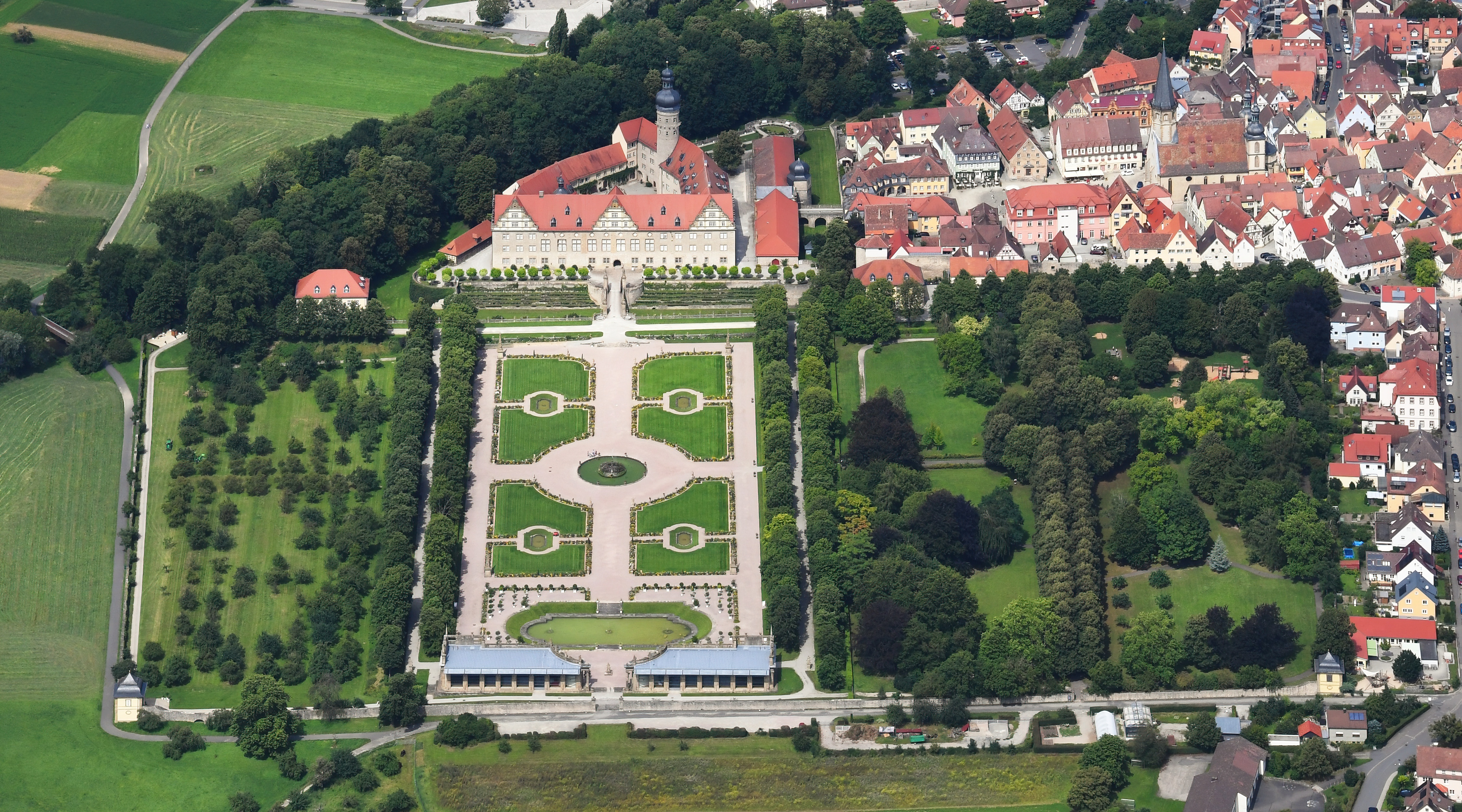
Aerial image of the Weikersheim Palace and gardens

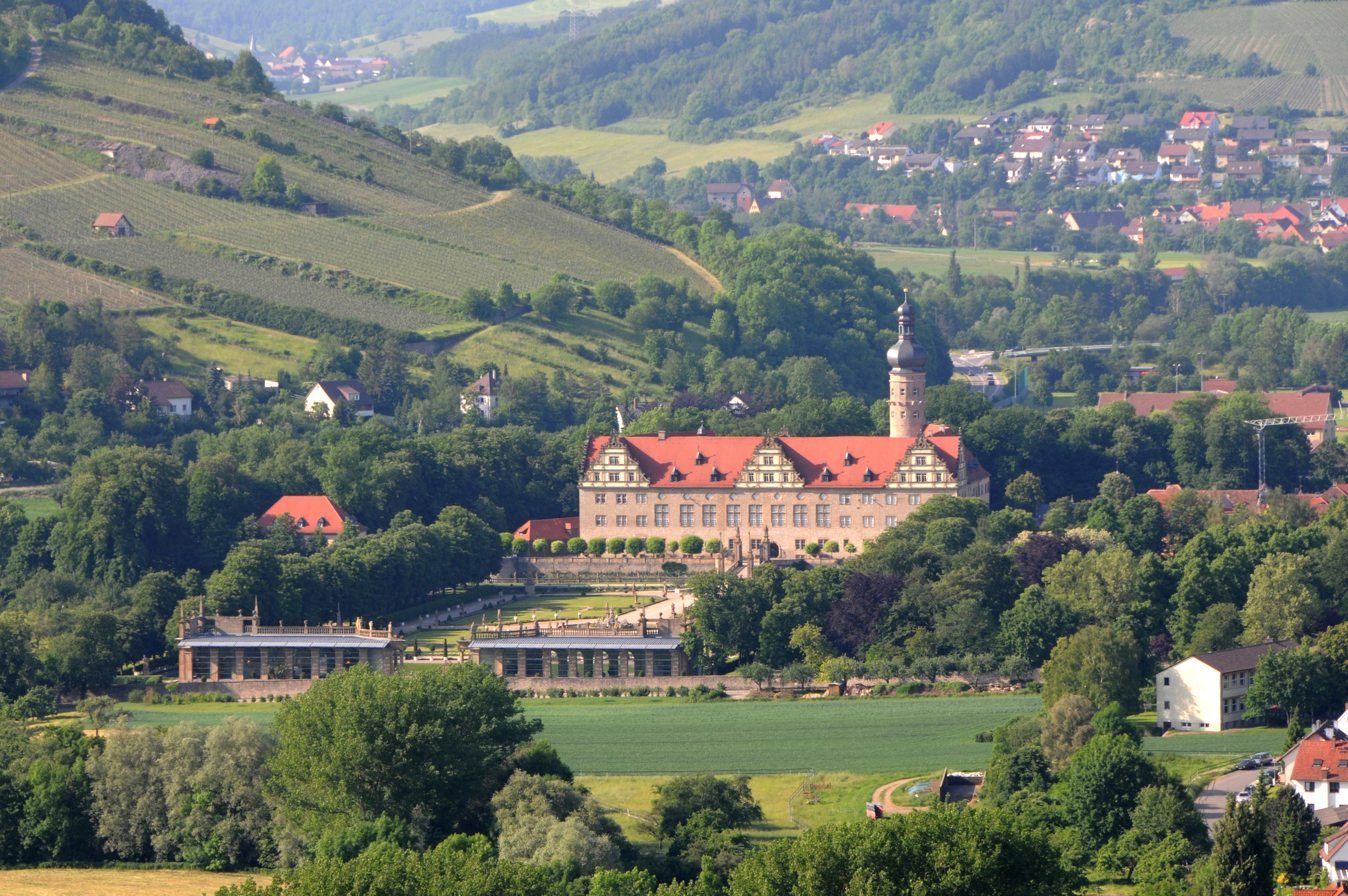
The palace in the valley

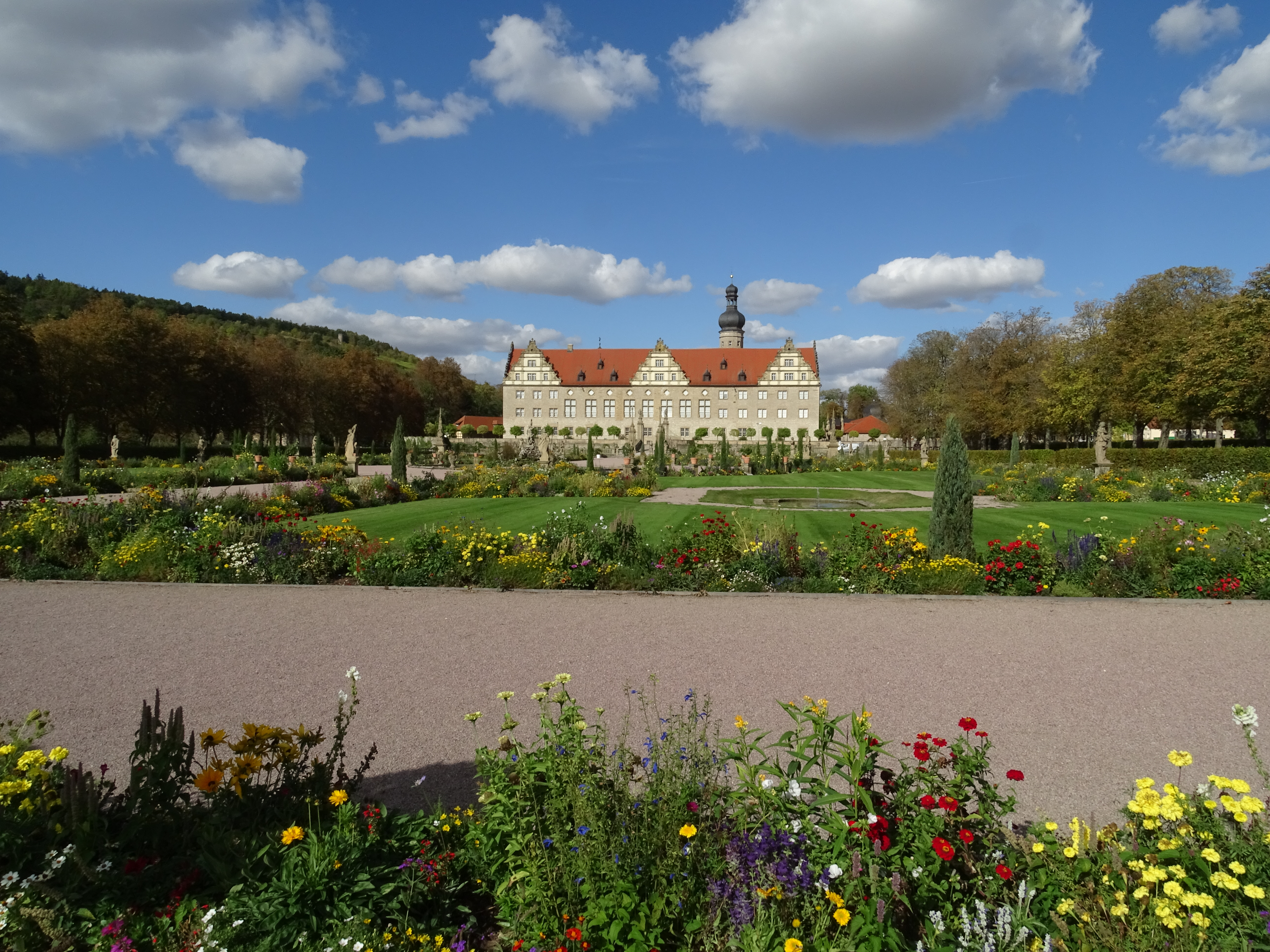
Palace and park

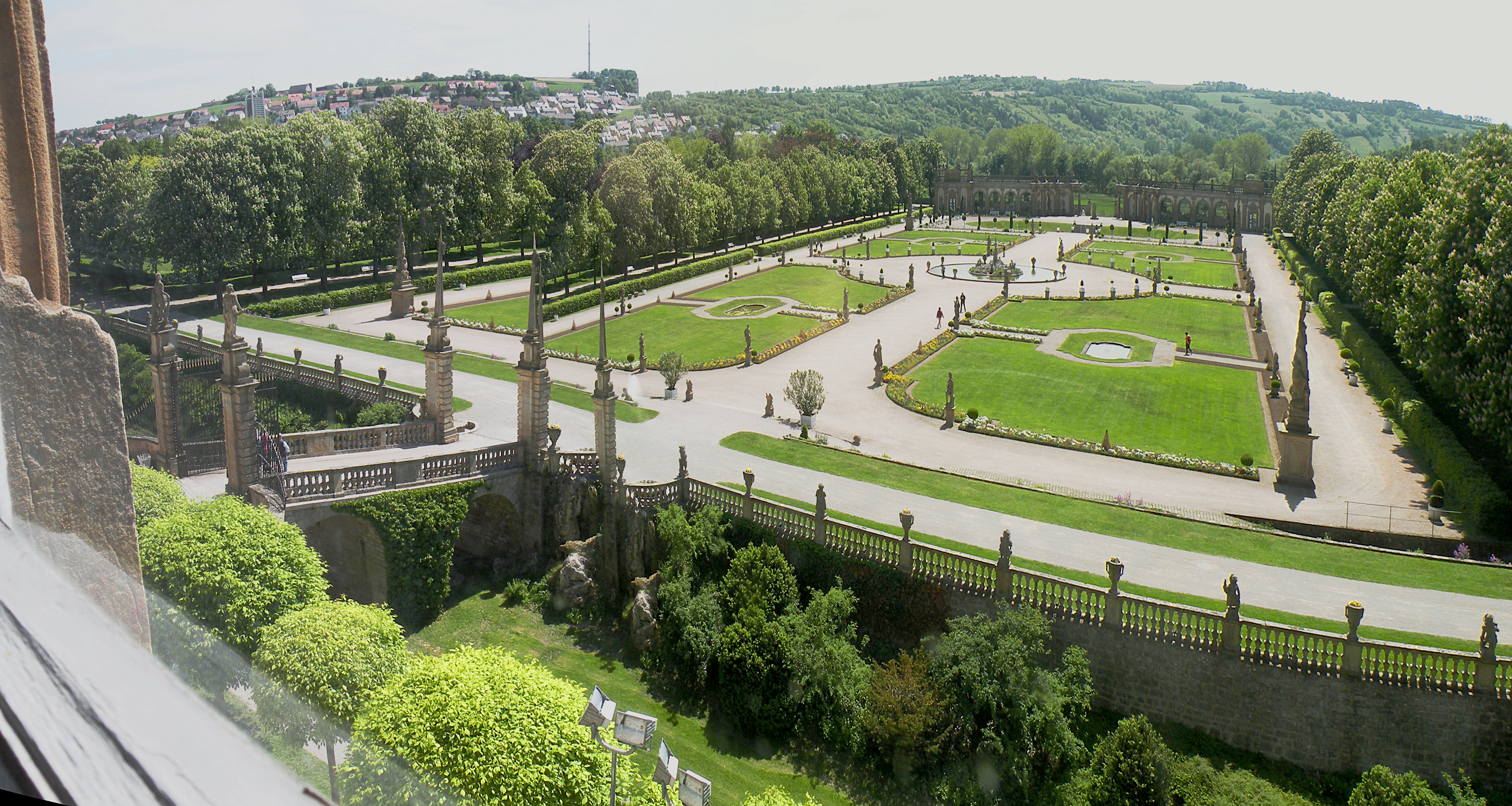
View into the park

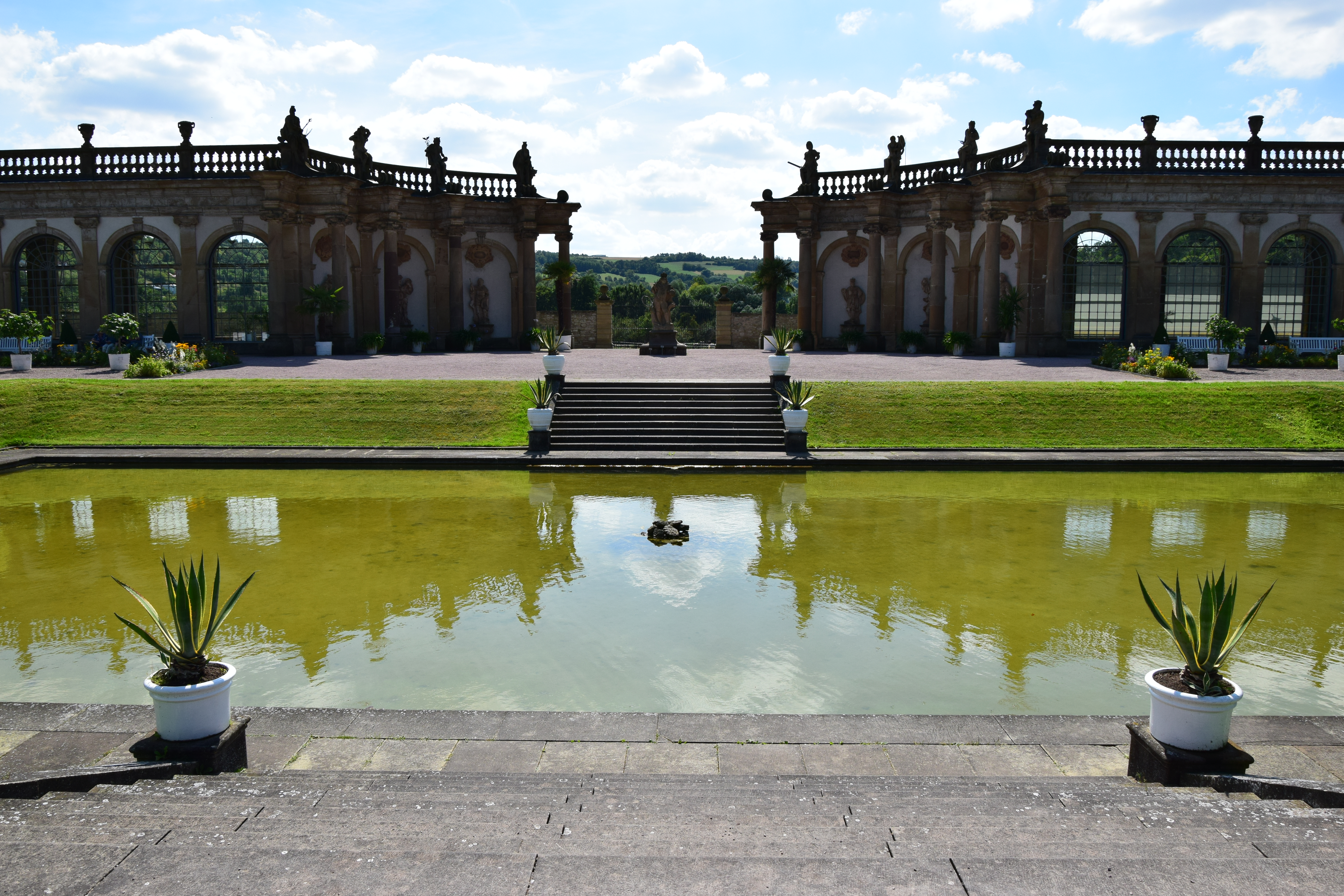
Orangery and basin

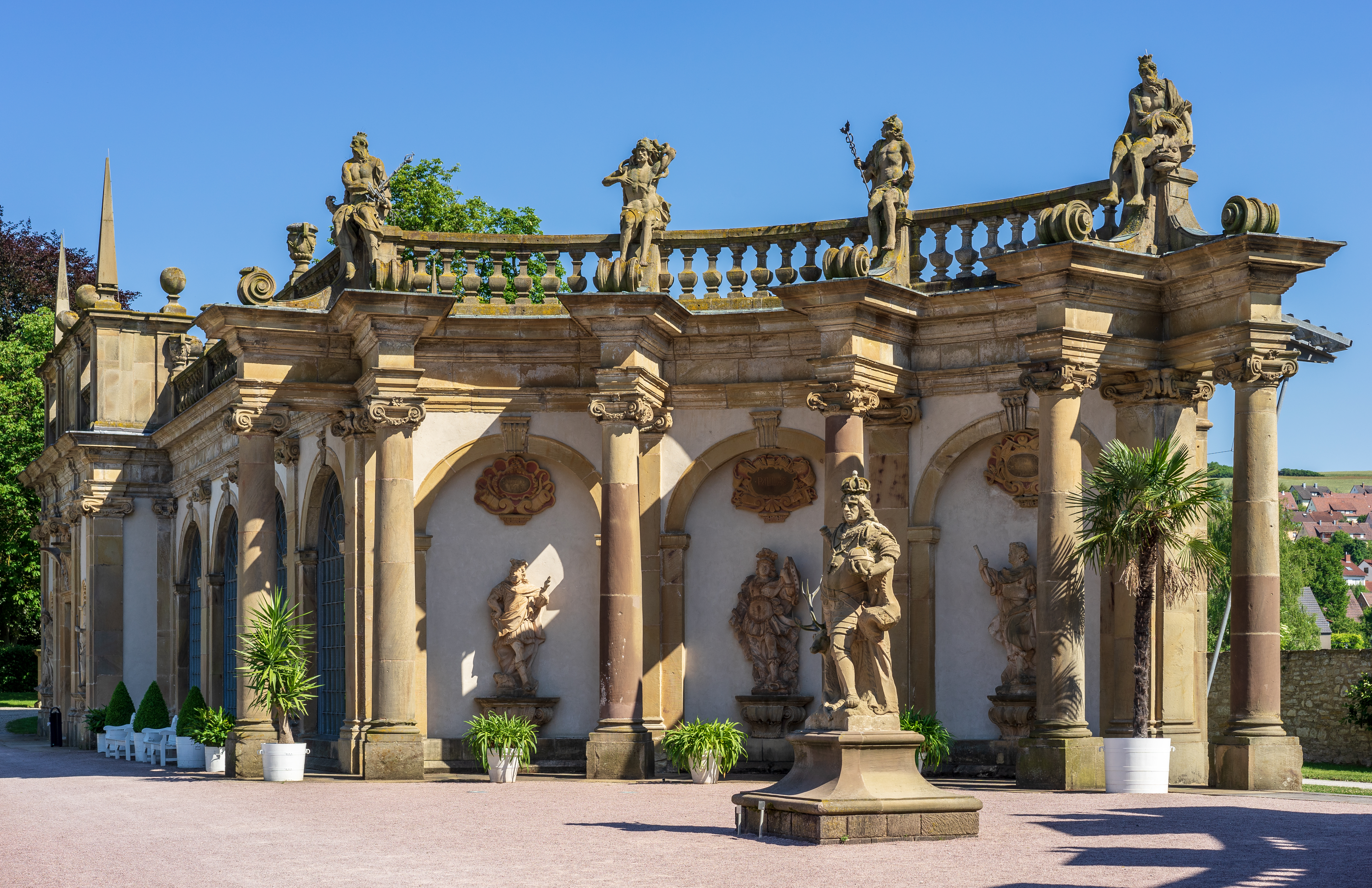
The orangery

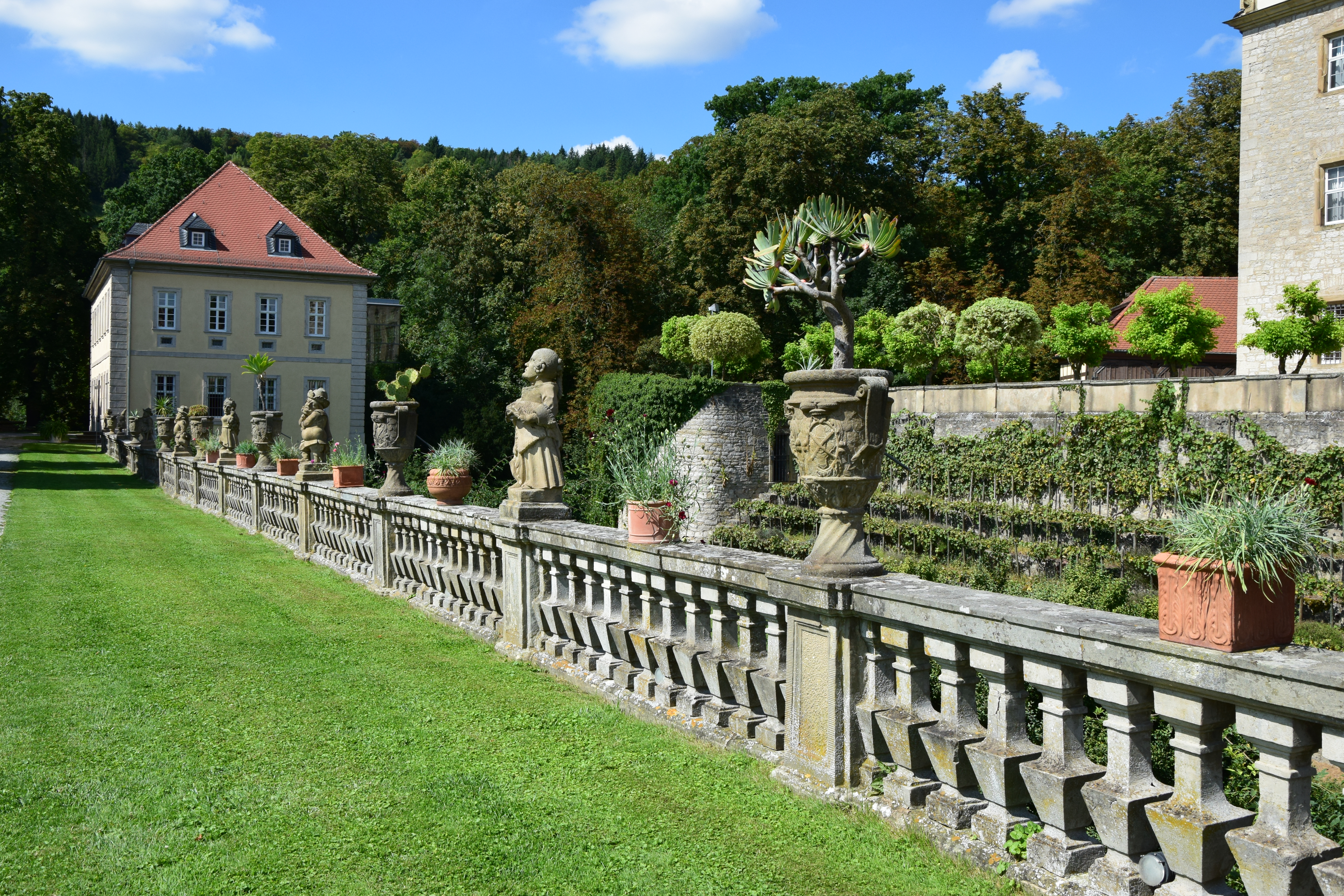
The Dwarfs’ Gallery

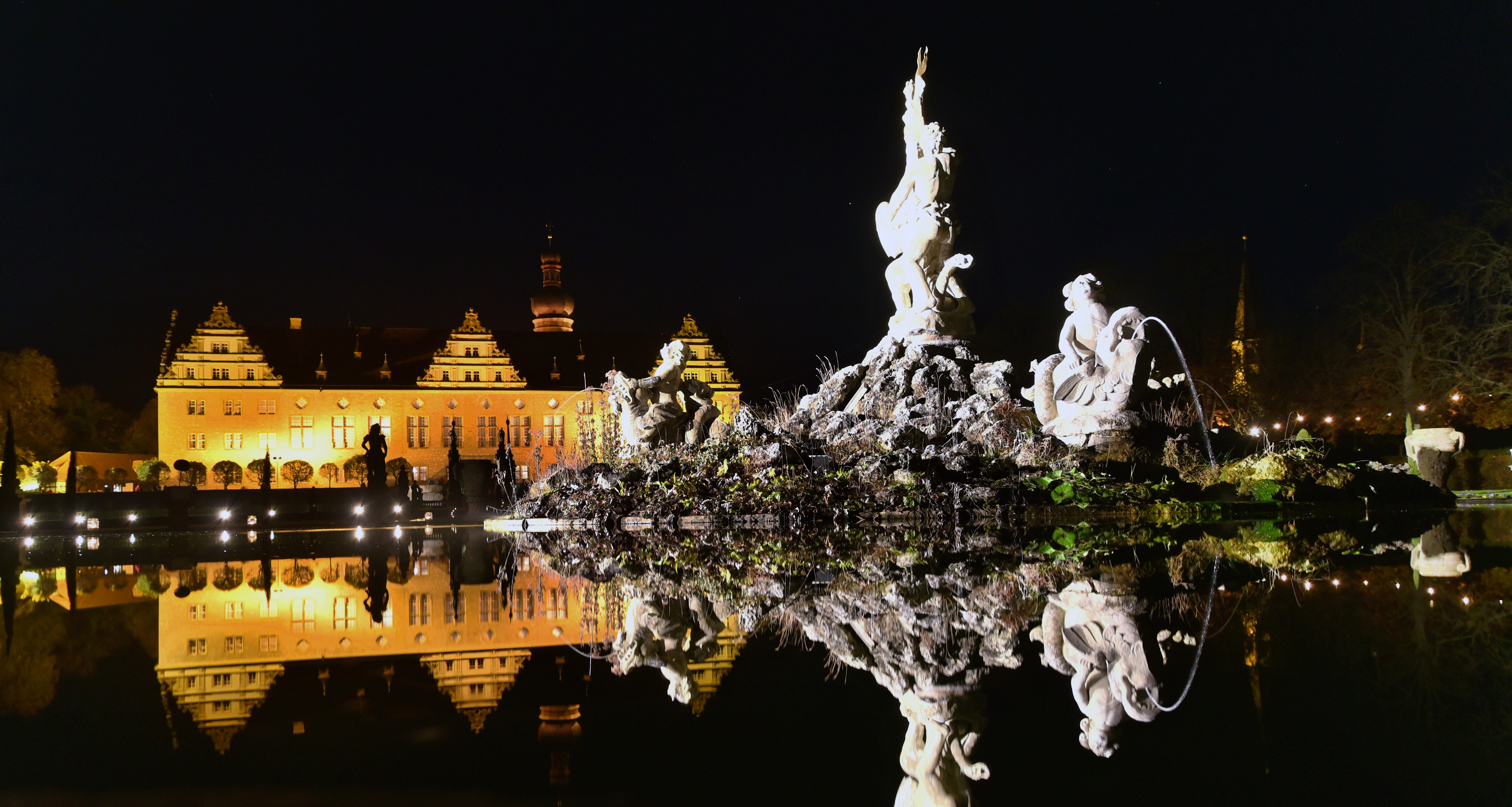
Hercules fountain

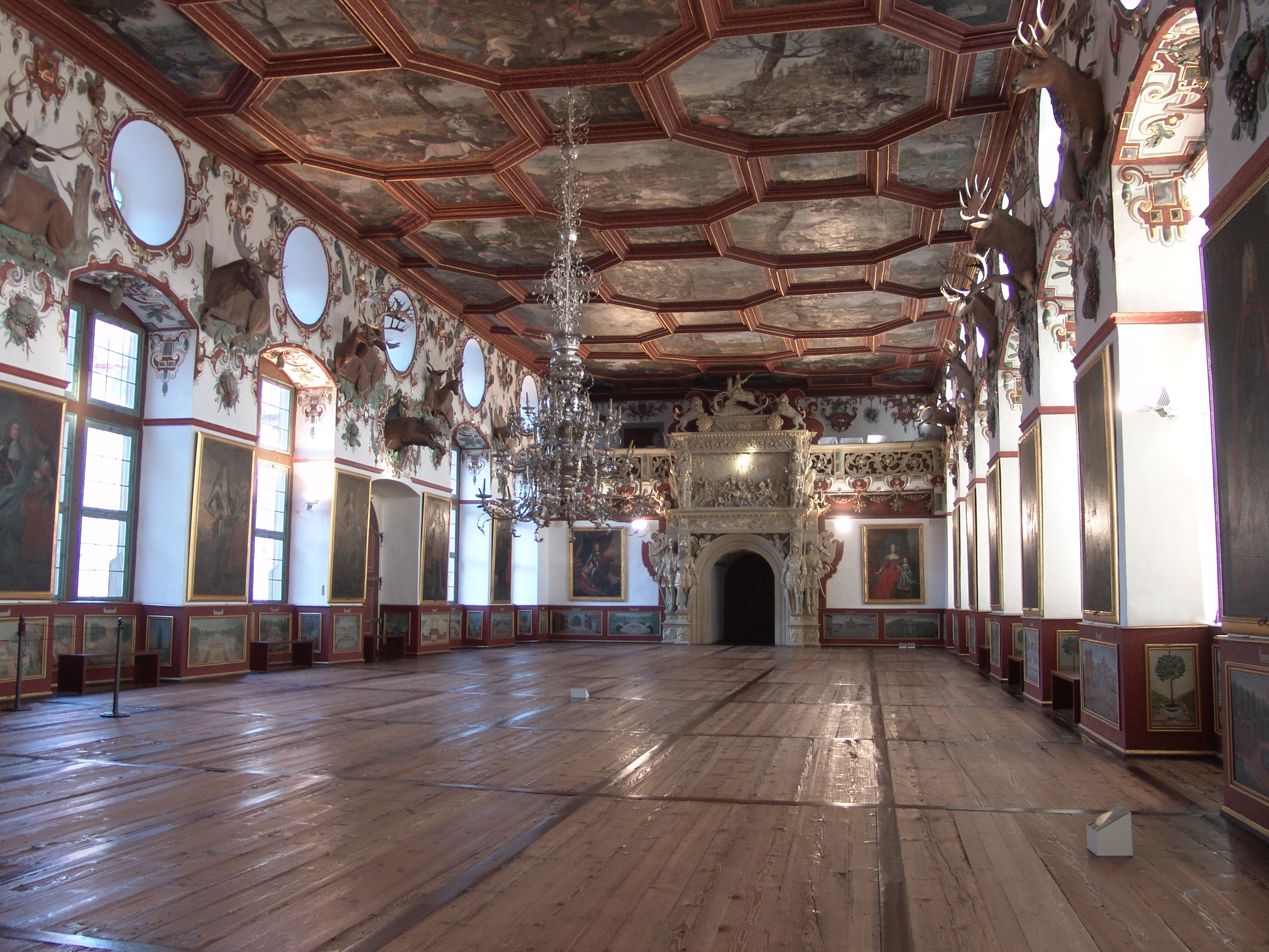
Ballroom

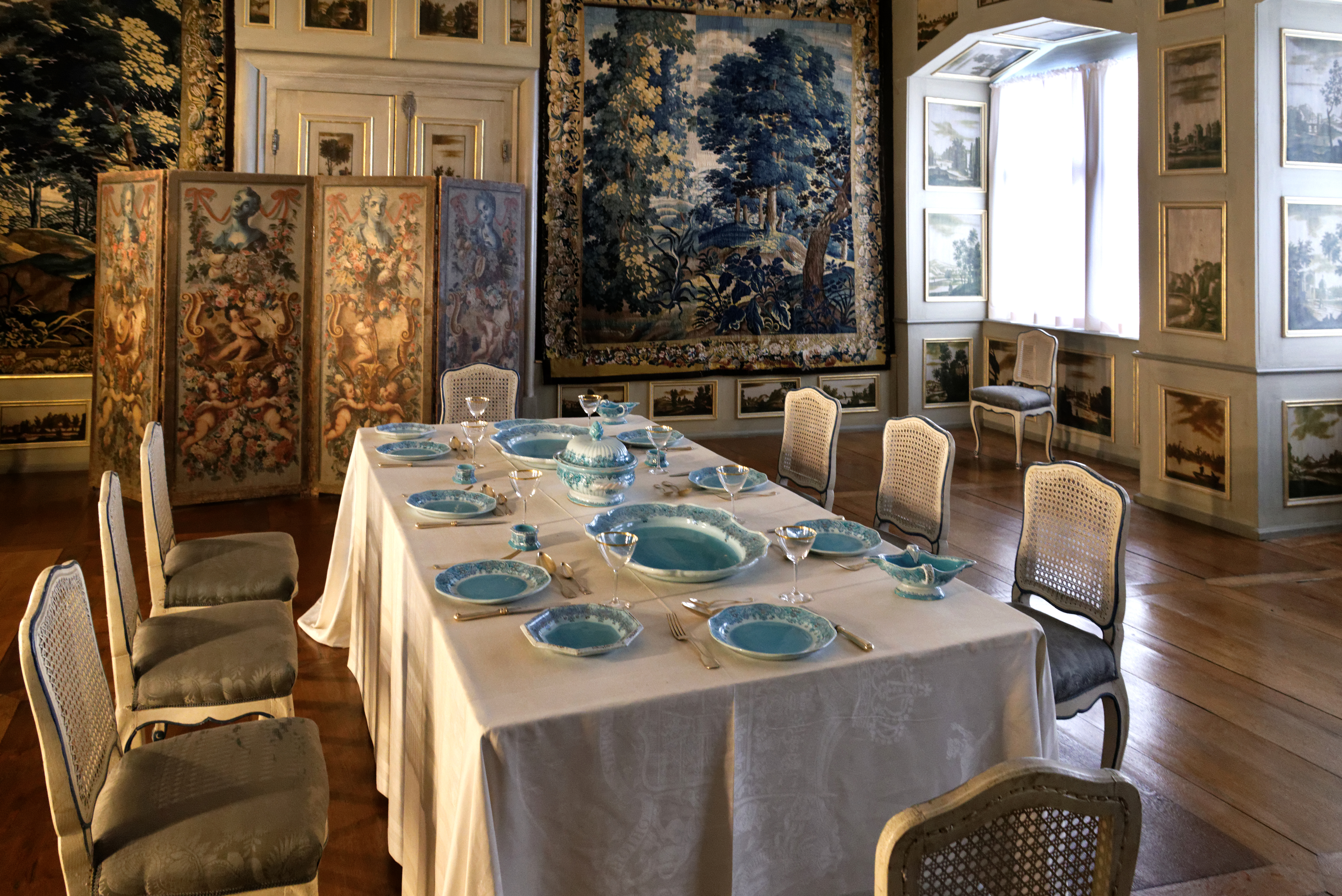
Dinner room

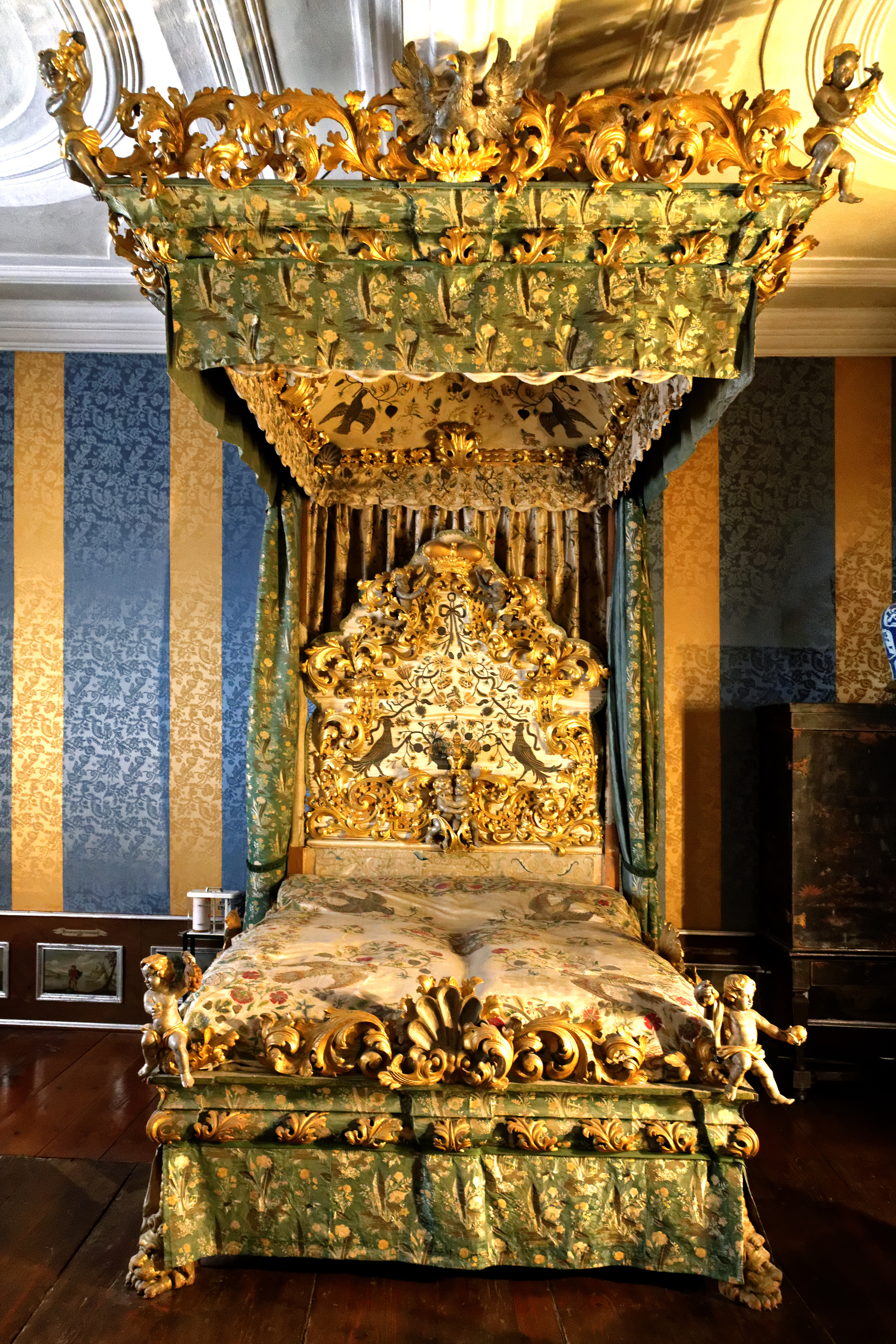
State bed
