= Kai Whittaker =

German politician (born 1985)

Kai Whittaker MdB
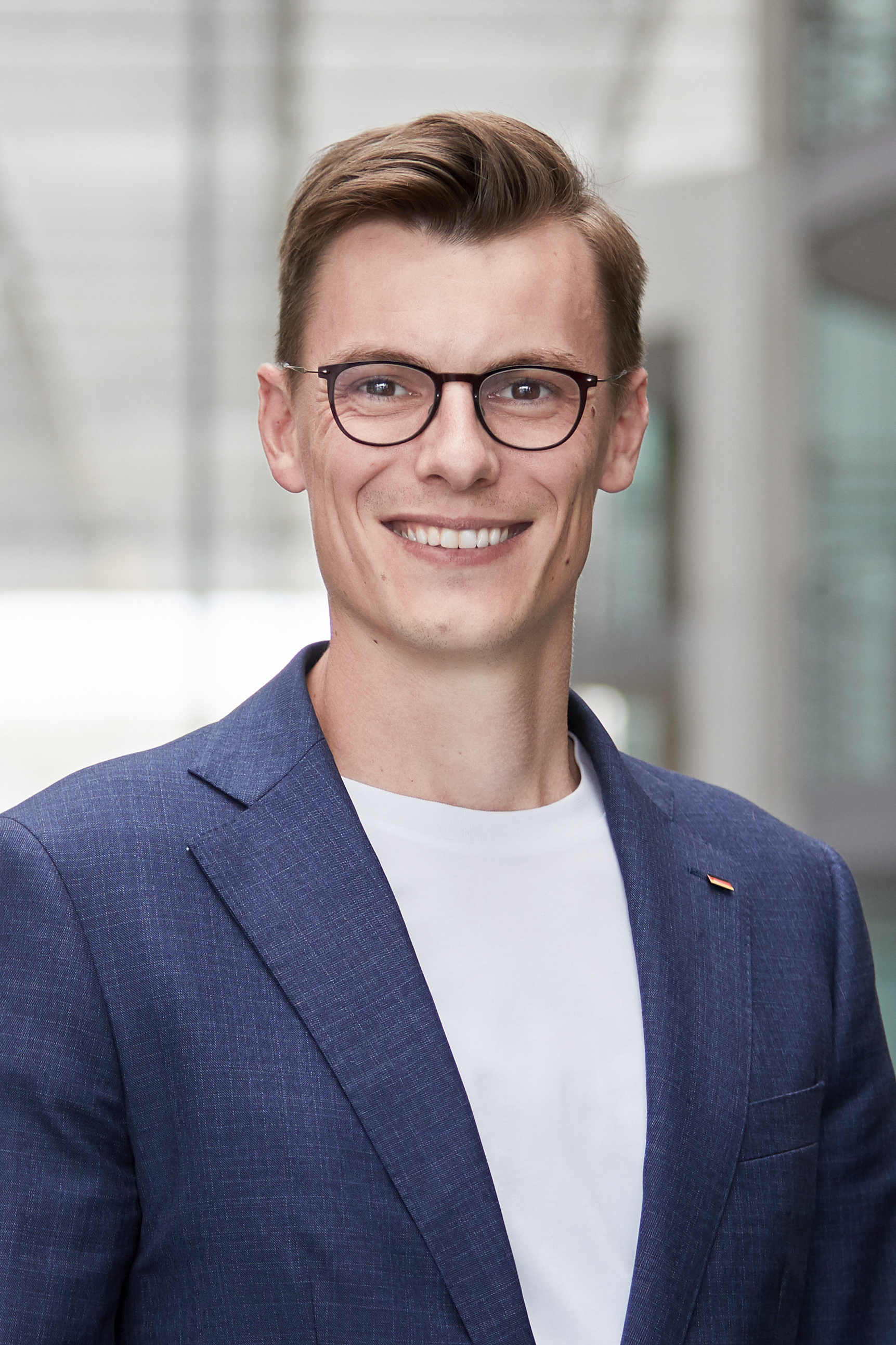
- Whittaker in 2021

Member of the Bundestag; for Rastatt
- Incumbent
- Assumed office 22 October 2013
- Preceded by: Peter Götz

Personal details
- Born: 10 April 1985 (age 41) Baden-Baden, West Germany
- Citizenship: Germany; United Kingdom
- Party: Christian Democratic Union (since 1999)
- Education: University of Bristol; London School of Economics
- Website: www.whittaker.de

Kai Whittaker (born 10 April 1985) is a German politician of the Christian Democratic Union (CDU) and member of the Bundestag since 2013.

== Education and early career ==
Born in Baden-Baden to a British father and German mother, Whittaker completed his Abitur at the Markgraf-Ludwig-Gymnasium in 2004. Following his Zivildienst, he studied Economics and Management at the University of Bristol, graduating in 2008. After a year working for Leoni AG, Whittaker then pursued a master's degree in European Political Economy at the London School of Economics, graduating in 2010. Between 2011 and 2013, he worked for Herrenknecht.

== Political career ==
Whittaker was directly elected to the Bundestag in 2013 with 53.5% of the vote in the Rastatt district. He has since been a member of the Committee on Labor and Social Affairs, serving as his parliamentary group's rapporteur on public procurement, social welfare and the effects of digitization of work. In 2018, he also joined the Parliamentary Advisory Council for Sustainable Development.

=== Positions ===
In June 2017, Whittaker voted against his parliamentary group's majority and in favor of Germany's introduction of same-sex marriage.

Ahead of the 2021 Christian Democratic Union of Germany leadership election, Whittaker publicly endorsed Norbert Röttgen to succeed Annegret Kramp-Karrenbauer as the party’s chair.

He is a member of the Union der Mitte, a centrist caucus of the CDU.
