= Franco Bassani =

Italian physicist (1929–2008)

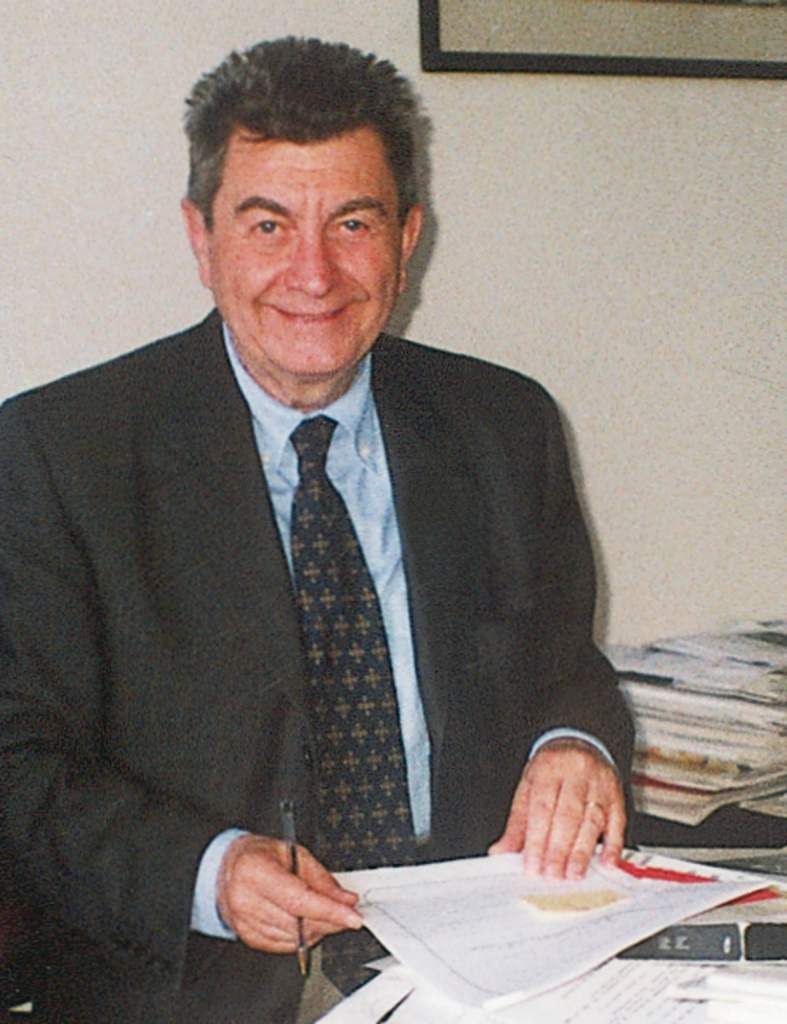
- Franco Bassani at his office
- Born: October 29, 1929; Milan, Italy
- Died: September 25, 2008 (aged 78); Pisa, Italy
- Education: University of Pavia
- Scientific career
- Fields: Physics
- Workplaces: Scuola Normale Superiore

Giuseppe Franco Bassani (October 29, 1929, Milan – September 25, 2008, Pisa) was an Italian physicist.

== Biography ==
Franco Bassani graduated cum laude in physics from the University of Pavia in November 1952. After two years as a researcher at the Italian National Research Council in Milan (with Professors Piero Caldirola and Fausto Fumi), he moved to the United States, where until 1956 he worked with Frederick Seitz at the University of Illinois. On his return to Italy, he served as adjunct professor at the Department of Physics, University of Palermo (1956–1957) and Pavia (1957–1959). Five years as an Associate Physicist at Argonne National Laboratory in Illinois marked a second American parentheses. Subsequently, he served as Professor of Theoretical Physics of the University of Messina (1964–1966) and Pisa (1966–1969), and professor of Solid State Physics at the University of Rome until 1980. In that period he was Invited Professor at École Polytechnique Fédérale de Lausanne (1972–1973) and at the University of Illinois, Urbana (1979–1980). In 1980, he became professor of Solid State Physics at the Scuola Normale Superiore in Pisa, where he taught until 2004 and was Director from 1995 to 1999. In 2005, he was appointed Professor Emeritus.

== Other assignments ==
From 1999 to 2007 he served as President of the Italian Society of Physics. He was also a Fellow of the British Institute of Physics since 1971, of the American Physical Society since 1982 and the European Physical Society in 2008. For the latter, from 1986 to 1992, he directed the Condensed Matter Division Board. He was a member of scientific committees and editorial offices of several international publications, including Solid State Communications (1972 to 1986) and Europhysics Letters (from 1986 to 1992). In 1990 he joined the Accademia dei Lincei.

== Scientific findings ==
His most significant scientific breakthroughs were made in the theory of electronic band structure of semiconductors, the photophysics of color centers in ionic crystals, the linear and nonlinear optical properties of semiconductors and insulating materials and the theory of excitons and polaritons in semiconductor low-dimensional systems. His method of calculating the optical response of a crystal based on pseudopotentials for electronic band structure and on the analysis of symmetry at the critical point is developed in one of his most significant publications, Electronic States and Optical Transitions in Solids (with G. Pastori Parravicini, Pergamon Press, Oxford 1975). This publication became a reference point for the subject. His contribution was crucial for the construction of synchrotron radiation devices in Italy.

== Prizes and awards ==
Franco Bassani has been awarded several honorary degrees (University of Toulouse in 1979, Ecole Polytechnique Fédérale de Lausanne in 1986, Purdue University in 1994). He was also awarded the coveted Premio Somaini per la Fisica (1979), Italgas Prize for Materials Science (1996), the Columbus Prize (1997) and the Silver Dolphin Award (Public Service of Cascina, 1998). In 2001, he received the Italian Gold Medal of Merit for Science and Culture. In 2005 he became Knight of Sancti Gregorii Magni. In 2008, finally, he was awarded the Medal of the Italian Physical Society.

== Main works ==
- Electronic States and Optical Transitions in Solids, F. Bassani and G. Pastori-Parravicini (Pergamon Press, Oxford 1975)
- Highlights of Condensed Matter Theory, Proceedings of the International School of Physics Enrico Fermi, Course LXXXIX, edited by F. Bassani, F. Fumi and M.P. Tosi (North Holland, Amsterdam, 1985)
- 7th General Conference of the Condensed Matter Division of the European Physical Society, Pisa, edited by F. Bassani, G. Grosso, G. Pastori-Parravicini, Physica Scripta, Vol T19A and T19B (1987)
- The Hydrogen Atom, Proceedings of the Symposium Held in Pisa, June 30-July 2, 1988, edited by F. Bassani, M. Inguscio e T.D. Hänsch (Springer-Verlag, Berlin, 1989)
- Encyclopaedia of Condensed Matter Physics, 6 volumes, edited by Franco Bassani, Gerald L. and Peter Wieder Liedl (Elsevier Press, Amsterdam, 2005)
