= Peter Götz =

German politician

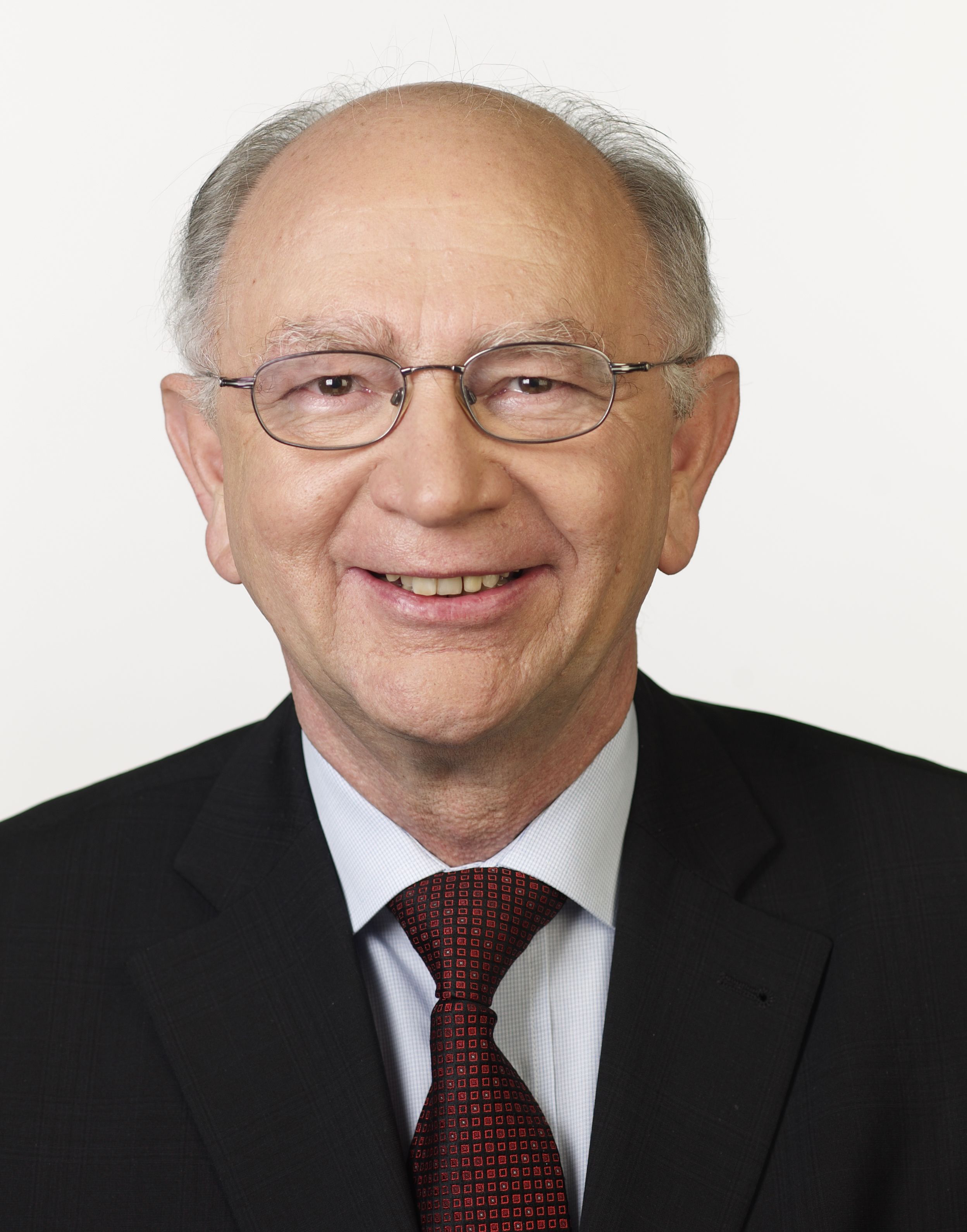
- Götz in 2009

Member of the Bundestag; for Rastatt
- In office 20 December 1990 – 22 October 2013
- Preceded by: Siegfried Hornung
- Succeeded by: Kai Whittaker

Personal details
- Born: 24 September 1947 (age 78) Baden-Baden, West Germany
- Party: Christian Democratic Union
- Children: 4

Peter Götz (born 24 September 1947) is a German politician of the Christian Democratic Union (CDU) and former member of the German Bundestag.

== Life ==
Götz joined the CDU and Junge Union in 1974 and was a member of the executive board of the CDU Rastatt from 1974 to 1982. From 1990 to 2013 Götz was a member of the German Bundestag. There he was chairman of the working group on local politics and spokesman for local politics of the CDU/CSU parliamentary group since 1998.
