= Chauncey Starr =

American nuclear engineer (1912–2007)

- Born: April 14, 1912; Newark, New Jersey
- Died: April 17, 2007 (aged 95); Atherton, California

Academic background
- Education: Rensselaer Polytechnic Institute

Chauncey Starr (April 14, 1912 – April 17, 2007) was an American electrical engineer and an expert in nuclear energy.

Born in Newark, New Jersey, Starr received an electrical engineering degree in 1932 and a Ph.D. in physics in 1935 from Rensselaer Polytechnic Institute.

Starr was vice president of Rockwell International and president of its Atomics International Division. In 1967 he became the dean of the UCLA School of Engineering and Applied Science. Six years later he founded the Electric Power Research Institute (EPRI) and was its first president. He was the first president emeritus of EPRI.

Starr was a member of the board of directors at the George C. Marshall Institute, a member of the board of science advisors of the Science and Environmental Policy Project (SEPP) and, like most other members of that board, he signed the Leipzig Declaration on Global Climate Change.

Starr died at his home in Atherton, California, from natural causes. The day before his death he celebrated his 95th birthday at an EPRI ceremony.

Starr was elected to the National Academy of Engineering in 1965. He was honored in 1976 with the Robert Henry Thurston Lecture Award from the American Society of Mechanical Engineers. He received in 1979 the Walter H. Zinn Award from the American Nuclear Society, and in 1990 he was awarded the National Medal of Technology by then President George H. W. Bush. He was a recipient of the Harold Pender Award in 1975.

== Selected publications ==
- Starr, C. (1969), "Social benefit versus technological risk", Science 165 (3899), pp. 1232-1238
