= Alexander Arpaschi =

German politician (born 1970)

Member of the Bundestag
- Incumbent
- Assumed office 25 March 2025
- Constituency: Rastatt

Personal details
- Born: 24 May 1970 (age 55) Karlsruhe
- Party: Alternative for Germany

Alexander Arpaschi (born 24 May 1970 in Karlsruhe) is a German politician belonging to the Alternative for Germany. In the 2025 German federal election, he was elected to the German Bundestag.

== Political career ==
Alexander Arpaschi joined the CDU in 2000 and was a member of the party until 2012. In 2014 Arpaschi joined the AfD. Between 2015 and 2017 he was a member of the AfD district chapter for Karlsruhe. Since 2019 he has been a member, and since 2024 chairman, of the AfD district chapter for Baden-Baden/Rastatt.
