= Leipzig Declaration =

1995 statement on global warming

The Leipzig Declaration on Global Climate Change is a statement made in 1995, seeking to refute the fact that there is a scientific consensus on the global warming issue. It was issued in an updated form in 1997 and revised again in 2005, claiming to have been signed by 80 scientists and 25 television news meteorologists while the posting of 33 additional signatories was pending verification that those 33 additional scientists still agreed with the statement. All versions of the declaration, which asserts that there is no scientific consensus about the importance of global warming and opposes the recommendations of the Kyoto Protocol, were penned by Fred Singer's Science and Environmental Policy Project (SEPP).

The first declaration was based on a 9–10 November 1995 conference, organized by Helmut Metzner in Leipzig, Germany. The second declaration was additionally based on a successor conference in Bonn, Germany on 10–11 November 1997. The conferences were cosponsored by SEPP and the European Academy for Environmental Affairs and titled International Symposium on the Greenhouse Controversy.

Today, the declaration is regarded as disinformation campaign, exercised by the climate change denial movement using the fake-expert-strategy, to cast doubt on the scientific consensus about global warming.

== Versions ==
=== The 1995 Declaration ===
The 1995 declaration asserts: "There does not exist today a general scientific consensus about the importance of greenhouse warming from rising levels of carbon dioxide. On the contrary, most scientists now accept the fact that actual observations from earth satellites show no climate warming whatsoever." The latter statement was broadly accurate at the time, but with additional data and correction of errors, all analyses of satellite temperature measurements now show statistically significant warming.

The declaration also criticised the United Nations Framework Convention on Climate Change, saying: "Energy is essential for all economic growth, and fossil fuels provide today's principal global energy source. In a world in which poverty is the greatest social pollutant, any restriction on energy use that inhibits economic growth should be viewed with caution. For this reason, we consider 'carbon taxes' and other drastic control policies ... to be ill-advised, premature, wrought with economic danger, and likely to be counterproductive."

==== Signatures ====
According to the SEPP website, there were 79 signatures to the 1995 declaration, including Frederick Seitz: the current SEPP chair. Perhaps the most prominent signatory to the declaration was Dr. Robert E. Stevenson, a former research scientist for NASA and the Scripps Institution of Oceanography. The signature list was last updated on 16 July 1996. Of these 79, 33 failed to respond when SEPP asked them to sign the 1997 declaration. SEPP calls the signatories "nearly 100 climate experts".

The signatures to the 1995 declaration were disputed by David Olinger of the St. Petersburg Times. In an article on 29 July 1996, he revealed that many signers, including Chauncey Starr, Robert Balling, and Patrick Michaels, have received funding from the oil industry, while others had no scientific training or could not be identified.

The 1995 declarations begins: "As scientists, we are intensely interested in the possibility that human activities may affect the global climate". However, those identified as scientists and climate experts include at least ten weather presenters, including Dick Groeber of Dick's Weather Service in Springfield, Ohio. Groeber, who had not completed a university degree, labelled himself a scientist by virtue of his thirty to forty years of self-study.

In any case, it is difficult to accurately evaluate the list of signatures of the 1995 declaration, as the SEPP website provides no additional details about them except for their university, if they are professors.

=== The 1997 Declaration ===
The 1997 declaration updated the 1995 declaration in a number of ways. The most obvious difference was its focus on the Kyoto Protocol, as the Kyoto conference was in the process of being finalised. The declaration says:

"We believe the Kyoto Protocol -- to curtail carbon dioxide emissions from only part of the world community -- is dangerously simplistic, quite ineffective, and economically destructive to jobs and standards-of-living. ... We consider the drastic emission control policies deriving from the Kyoto conference -- lacking credible support from the underlying science -- to be ill-advised and premature."

The 1997 declaration also updated its citations of evidence that appeared to run contrary to the consensus on global warming. For example, the 1995 declaration cites "observations from earth satellites," where the 1997 declaration cites "observations from both weather satellites and balloon-borne radiosondes." As with satellite data, subsequent analysis of radiosondes has shown a statistically significant warming trend.

==== Signatures ====
The declaration begins: "As independent scientists concerned with atmospheric and climate problems, we...". As with the 1995 declaration, questions have been raised about the scientific background of the signers, and others have questioned the degree to which they can be deemed to be independent. Because many of those who signed the 1997 declaration also signed the 1995 declaration, the concerns raised by David Olinger and others after the 1995 declaration are still relevant.

The signers are generally described by Fred Singer and his supporters as climate scientists, although the current signers also include 25 weather presenters. One key report opposing the scientific credentials of the signers was a Danish Broadcasting Company TV special by Øjvind Hesselager. Hesselager attempted to contact the declaration's 33 European signers and found that four of them could not be located, twelve denied ever having signed, and some had not even heard of the Leipzig Declaration. Those who verified signing included a medical doctor, a nuclear scientist, and an entomologist. After discounting the signers whose credentials were inflated, irrelevant, false, or unverifiable, Hesselager claimed that only 20 of the names on the list had any scientific connection with the study of climate change, and some of those names were known to have obtained grants from the oil and fuel industry, including the German coal industry and the government of Kuwait (a major oil exporter). As a result of Hesselager's report, Singer removed some, but not all, of the discredited signatures. The number of signatures on the document, according to SEPP's own press releases, has declined from 140 (according to a December 1997 press release) to 105 (as of February 2003).

SEPP's position is that "a few of the original signers did not have the 'proper' academic credentials - even though they understand the scientific climate issues quite well. To avoid this kind of smear, we want to restrict the Leipzig Declaration to signers with impeccable qualifications." To address the signer credibility issue, SEPP has provided considerably more information about each signer on their website and lists the weather presenters separately from the other signers.

=== 2005, revised ===
As of 2010, Singer's SEPP website listed the "2005, revised" declaration (which still spoke of the 1997 Kyoto conference as a future event). This version included the claim: "In fact, many climate specialists now agree that actual observations from weather satellites show no global warming whatsoever".

== Use of the declarations ==
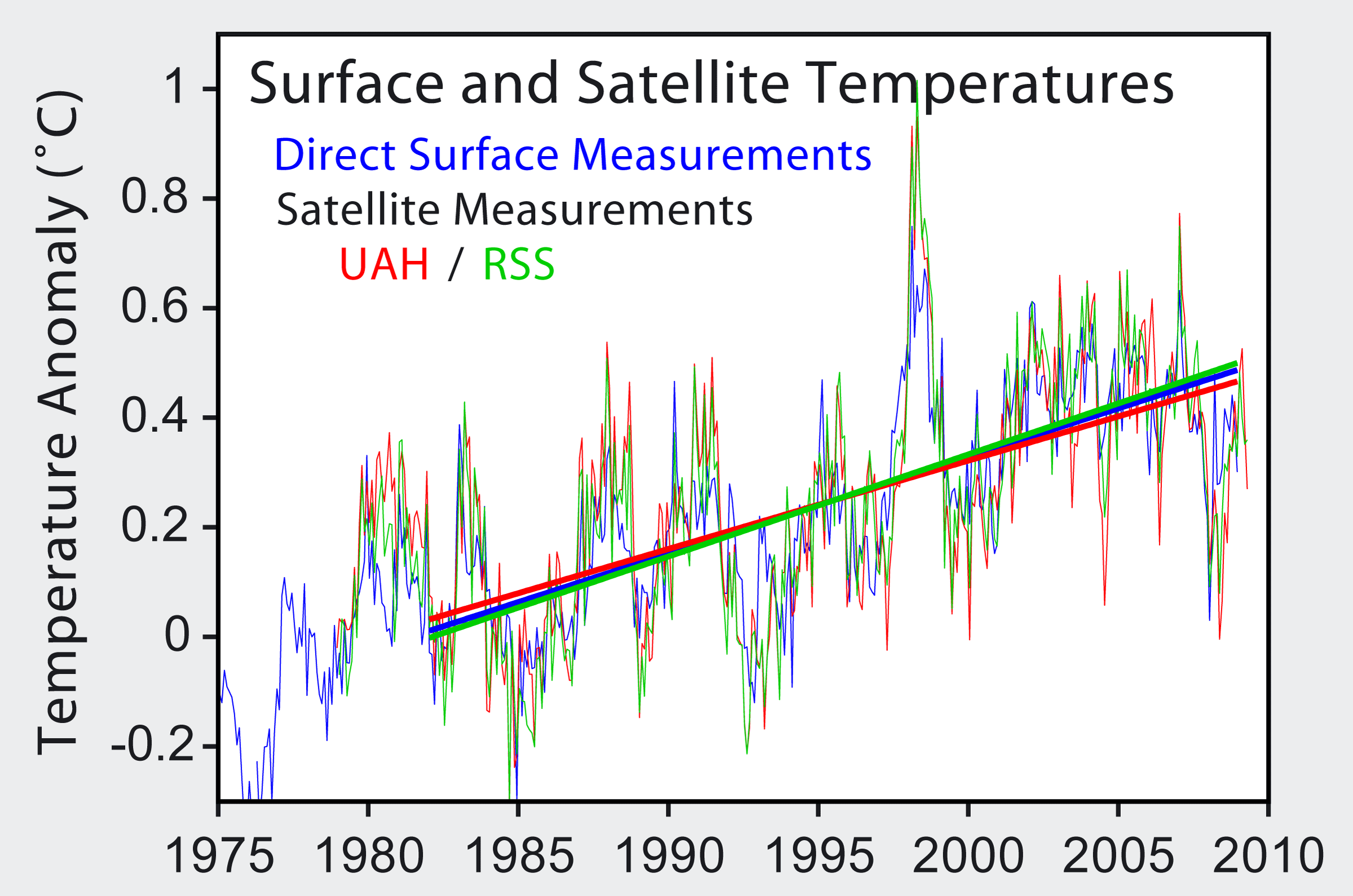
Comparison of ground-based (blue) and satellite-based (red: UAH; green: RSS) records of temperature variations since 1979. Trends plotted since January 1982. (Source: Publicly available data, figure by Robert A. Rohde)

The declarations have been widely cited by some in the "sound science" movement. It has been cited by Fred Singer in editorial columns appearing in hundreds of websites and major publications, including The Wall Street Journal, Miami Herald, The Detroit News, Chicago Tribune, The Plain Dealer, Memphis Commercial Appeal, The Seattle Times, and the Orange County Register. Jeff Jacoby, a columnist with The Boston Globe, described the signers of the Leipzig Declaration as "climate scientists" that "include prominent scholars." Think tanks such as The Heritage Foundation, The Heartland Institute, and Australia's Institute for Public Affairs called them "noted scientists." Both the Leipzig Declaration and Frederick Seitz's Oregon Petition have been quoted as authoritative sources during deliberations in the U.S. Senate and House of Representatives.

Although the key data on which the Leipzig declaration relied (such as satellite temperature measurements) has been invalidated by subsequent research, and much new evidence has accumulated, the declaration continues to be cited, along with the Oregon Petition, as evidence of the current views of scientists on climate change. Moreover, the organizers have not changed their stated position of rejecting global warming with human activity as primary driver.

== Original texts ==
1995 declaration:

- "The Leipzig Declaration On Global Climate Change". SEPP. Archived from the original on 1998-12-06.

1997 declaration:

- "The Leipzig Declaration On Global Climate Change". SEPP. Archived from the original on 2006-10-29.

2005 declaration (revised):

- "The Leipzig Declaration on Global Climate Change (2005, revised)". SEPP. Archived from the original on 2006-08-27.

== See also ==
- Scientific opinion on climate change
