= Frederick Seitz =

American academic administrator and physicist (1911–2008)

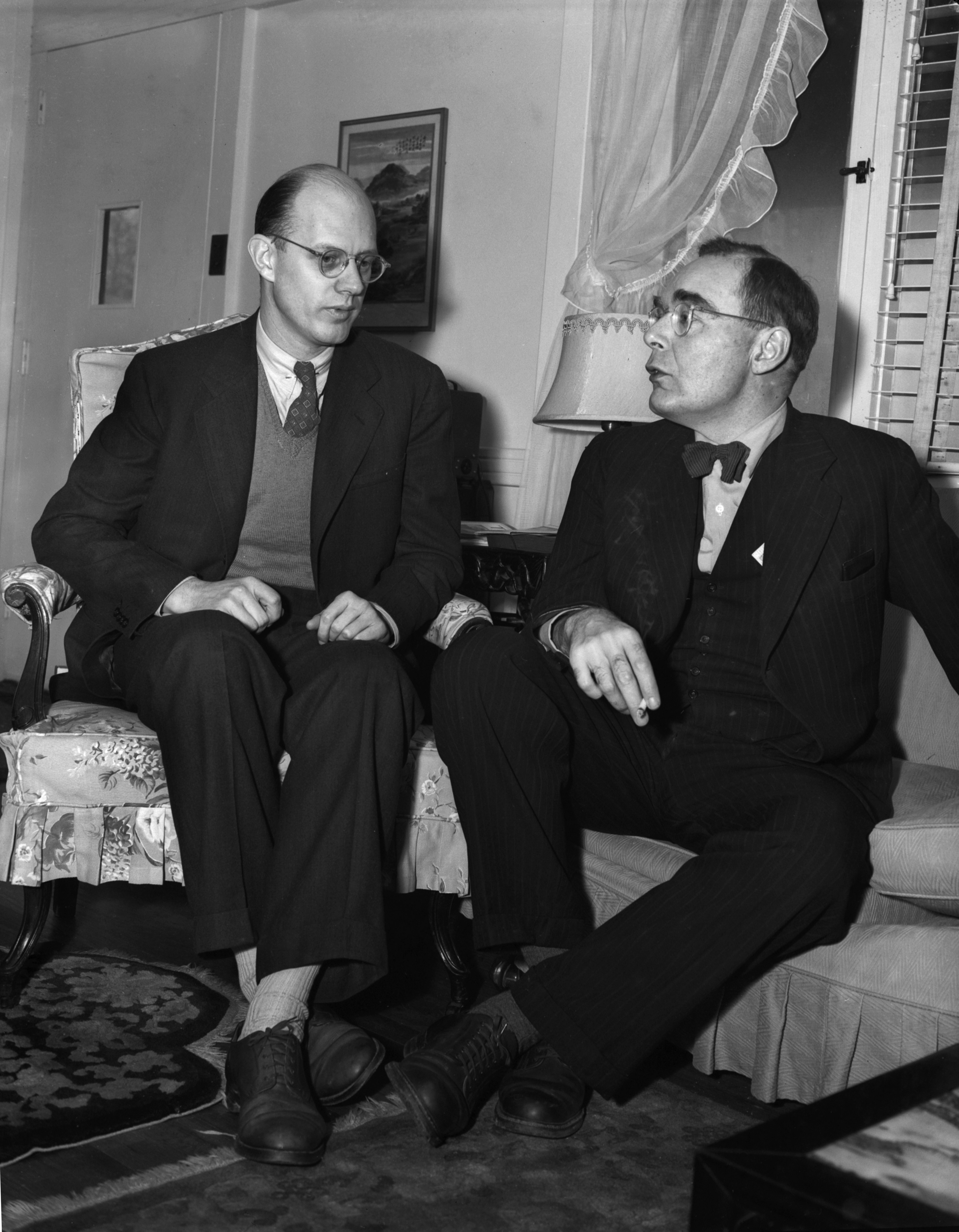
- Seitz and H.A. Kramers

4th President of the Rockefeller University
- In office 1968–1978
- Preceded by: Detlev Bronk
- Succeeded by: Joshua Lederberg

17th President of the National Academy of Sciences
- In office 1962–1969
- Preceded by: Detlev Bronk
- Succeeded by: Philip Handler

Personal details
- Born: July 4, 1911 San Francisco, California, U.S.
- Died: March 2, 2008 (aged 96) New York City, New York, U.S.
- Education: Stanford University (BS); Princeton University (PhD)
- Scientific career
- Known for: Wigner–Seitz unit cell
- Awards: National Medal of Science (1973); Vannevar Bush Award (1983)
- Fields: Physics
- Workplaces: University of Illinois; Rockefeller University
- Thesis: A matrix-algebraic development of the crystallographic groups (1934)
- Doctoral advisor: Eugene Wigner
- Doctoral students: Franco Bassani; Ronald Fuchs; Jack Goldman; Walter A. Harrison; James Stark Koehler

Frederick Seitz (/saɪts/;) (July 4, 1911 – March 2, 2008) was an American physicist, a pioneer of solid state physics, and a climate change denier. Seitz was the 4th president of Rockefeller University from 1968 to 1978, and the 17th president of the National Academy of Sciences from 1962 to 1969. Seitz was the recipient of the National Medal of Science, NASA's Distinguished Public Service Award, and other honors.

He founded the Frederick Seitz Materials Research Laboratory at the University of Illinois at Urbana–Champaign and several other material research laboratories across the United States. Seitz was also the founding chairman of the George C. Marshall Institute.

== Background and personal life ==
Seitz was born in San Francisco on July 4, 1911. His mother was also from San Francisco and his father, after whom he was named, was born in Germany. Seitz graduated from Lick-Wilmerding High School in the middle of his senior year, and went on to study physics at Stanford University obtaining his bachelor's degree in three years, graduating in 1932. He married Elizabeth K. Marshall on May 18, 1935.

Seitz died March 2, 2008, in New York. He was survived by a son, three grandchildren, and four great-grandchildren.

== Early career ==
Construction of a Wigner–Seitz primitive cell.

Seitz moved to Princeton University to study metals under Eugene Wigner, gaining his PhD in 1934. He and Wigner pioneered one of the first quantum theories of crystals, and developed concepts in solid-state physics such as the Wigner–Seitz unit cell used in the study of crystalline material in solid-state physics.

== Academic career ==
After graduate studies, Seitz continued to work on solid state physics, publishing The Modern Theory of Solids in 1940, motivated by a desire to "write a cohesive account of the various aspects of solid-state physics in order to give the field the kind of unity it deserved". The Modern Theory of Solids helped unify and understand the relations between the fields of metallurgy, ceramics, and electronics. He was also a consultant on many World War II-related projects in metallurgy, radiation damage to solids and electronics amongst others. He, along with Hillard Huntington, made the first calculation of the energies of formation and migration of vacancies and interstitials in copper, inspiring many works on point defects in metals. The scope of his published work ranged widely, also covering "spectroscopy, luminescence, plastic deformation, irradiation effects, physics of metals, self-diffusion, point defects in metals and insulators, and science policy".

Early in his academic career, Seitz served on the faculty of the University of Rochester (1935–37) and after an interlude as a research physicist at General Electric Laboratories (1937–39) he was at the University of Pennsylvania (1939–1942) and then the Carnegie Institute of Technology (1942–49).

From 1946 to 1947, Seitz was director of the training program in atomic energy at Oak Ridge National Laboratory. He was appointed professor of physics at the University of Illinois, Urbana-Champaign, in 1949, becoming chairman of the department in 1957 and dean and vice-president for research in 1964. Seitz also served as an advisor to NATO. From 1962 to 1969 Seitz served as president of the United States National Academy of Sciences (NAS), in a full-time capacity from 1965. As NAS president he initiated the Universities Research Association, which contracted with the Atomic Energy Commission to construct the world's largest particle accelerator at the time, Fermilab.

He was the president of Rockefeller University from 1968 to 1978 during which he helped to launch new research programs in molecular biology, cell biology, and neuroscience as well as creating a joint MD-PhD program with Cornell University. He retired from Rockefeller University in 1979, when he was made President Emeritus.

== Consultancy career ==
After Seitz published a paper on the darkening of crystals, DuPont asked him in 1939 for help with a problem they were having with the stability of chrome yellow. He became "deeply involved" in their research efforts. Among other things, he investigated the possible use of non-toxic silicon carbide as a white pigment. Seitz was a director of Texas Instruments (1971–1982) and of Akzona Corporation (1973–1982).

Shortly before his 1979 retirement from Rockefeller University, Seitz began working as a permanent consultant for the R.J. Reynolds Tobacco Company, advising their medical research program until 1988. Reynolds had previously provided "very generous" support for biomedical work at Rockefeller. Seitz later wrote that "The money was all spent on basic science, medical science," and pointed to Reynolds-funded research on mad cow disease and tuberculosis. Nonetheless, later academic studies of tobacco industry influence concluded that Seitz, who helped allocate $45m of Reynolds' research funding, "played a key role... in helping the tobacco industry produce uncertainty concerning the health impacts of smoking." According to a tobacco industry memo from 1989, Seitz was described by an employee of Philip Morris International as "quite elderly and not sufficiently rational to offer advice."

In 1984 Seitz was the founding chairman of the George C. Marshall Institute, and was its chairman until 2001. The Institute was founded to argue for President Reagan's Strategic Defense Initiative, but "in the 1990s it branched out to become one of the leading think tanks trying to debunk the science of climate change." A 1990 report co-authored with Institute co-founders Robert Jastrow and William Nierenberg "centrally informed the Bush administration's position on human-induced climate change". The Institute also promoted environmental skepticism more generally. In 1994, the Institute published a paper by Seitz titled Global warming and ozone hole controversies: A challenge to scientific judgment. Seitz questioned the view that CFCs "are the greatest threat to the ozone layer". In the same paper, commenting on the dangers of secondary inhalation of tobacco smoke, he concluded "there is no good scientific evidence that passive inhalation is truly dangerous under normal circumstances."

Seitz was a central figure amongst global warming deniers. He was the highest-ranking scientist among a band of doubters who, beginning in the early 1990s, resolutely disputed suggestions that global warming was serious threat. Seitz argued that the science behind global warming was inconclusive and "certainly didn't warrant imposing mandatory limits on greenhouse-gas emissions". In 2001 Seitz and Jastrow questioned whether global warming is anthropogenic.

Seitz signed the 1995 Leipzig Declaration and, in an open letter inviting scientists to sign the Oregon Institute of Science and Medicine's global warming petition, called for the United States to reject the Kyoto Protocol. The letter was accompanied by a 12-page article on climate change which followed a style and format nearly identical to that of a contribution to Proceedings of the National Academy of Sciences (PNAS), a scientific journal, even including a date of publication ("October 26") and volume number ("Vol. 13: 149–164 1999"), but was not actually a publication of the National Academy of Science (NAS). In response the United States National Academy of Sciences took what the New York Times called "the extraordinary step of refuting the position of one [of] its former presidents." The NAS also made it clear that "The petition does not reflect the conclusions of expert reports of the Academy."

Seitz worked extensively with Fred Singer during his consultancy career for tobacco and oil corporations in matters of health and climate change, respectively.

== Publishing ==
Seitz wrote a range of scientific books in his field, including The Modern Theory of Solids (1940) and The Physics of Metals (1943). Later he co-authored books such as the Theory of Lattice Dynamics in the Harmonic Approximation (1971) and Solid State Physics. The latter, begun in 1955, with David Turnbull, reached 60 volumes by 2008, with Seitz remaining an active editor until volume 38 in 1984. Solid State Physics continues to be published by Elsevier. After his retirement he co-authored a book on global warming, published via the George C. Marshall Institute he chaired. He published his autobiography in 1994. Other works included biographies of American physicist Francis Wheeler Loomis (1991) and Canadian inventor Reginald Fessenden (1999), a history of silicon, and a history of the US National Academy of Sciences (2007).

== Criticism ==
In the early 1970s, Seitz became unpopular for his support of the Vietnam war, a position which most of his colleagues on the President's Science Advisory Committee did not share. In the late 1970s, Seitz also parted company with his scientific colleagues on questions of nuclear preparedness. Seitz was committed to "a muscular military strengthened by the most technologically advanced weaponry", while the scientific community generally supported arms limitations talks and treaties. Seitz was also ardently anti-communist and his support for aggressive weapons programs was a reflection of this.

In their book Merchants of Doubt, science historians Naomi Oreskes and Erik M. Conway state that Seitz and a group of other scientists fought the scientific evidence and spread confusion on many of the most important issues of the 20th and 21st centuries like harmfulness of tobacco smoke, acid rain, CFCs, pesticides and global warming. Seitz said that American science had become "rigid", and his colleagues had become closed-minded and dogmatic. According to Oreskes and Conway, Seitz used normal uncertainties of scientific evidence to spread doubt about the harmfulness of tobacco smoke.

Seitz was also a principal organizer of the infamous Oregon Petition, where numerous signatories claimed that there was no evidence that greenhouse gases were responsible for global warming. Despite Seitz being a past President of the US National Academy of Sciences, the NAS issued a press release stating "The petition project was a deliberate attempt to mislead scientists and to rally them in an attempt to undermine support for the Kyoto Protocol. The petition was not based on a review of the science of global climate change, nor were its signers experts in the field of climate science." Journalists subsequently found that the identities of the vast majority of signatories could not be verified, because the petition's organizers had no process for identity authentication. Further, the supposed scientific article that claimed to refute global warming (and which accompanied the petition) was in fact a non-peer reviewed article from the "Journal of the American Association of Physicians and Surgeons", which was published by Arthur Robinson, the petition's co-organizer. This journal advocates scientifically discredited viewpoints such as claiming that there is no connection between the HIV virus and AIDS, and is not indexed in PubMed.

Oreskes and Conway were critical of Seitz's involvement in the tobacco industry. They stated that Seitz stood against the scientific consensus that smoking was dangerous to people's health, and helped to create confusion and doubt on this issue.

== Awards and recognition ==
Seitz was elected to the American Philosophical Society in 1946. He was elected to the United States National Academy of Sciences in 1952, serving as its President from 1962 to 1969. He was elected to the American Academy of Arts and Sciences in 1962. He received the Franklin Medal (1965). In 1973 he was awarded the National Medal of Science "for his contributions to the modern quantum theory of the solid state of matter." He also received the United States Department of Defense Distinguished Service Award; the National Aeronautics and Space Administration's Distinguished Public Service Award; and the Compton Award, the highest honor of the American Institute of Physics. In addition to Rockefeller University, 31 universities in the US and abroad awarded Seitz honorary degrees. He was also a member of the Council on Foreign Relations.

Seitz served on a range of boards of charitable institutions, including (as chair) John Simon Guggenheim Memorial Foundation (1976–1983) and Woodrow Wilson National Fellowship Foundation, and (as trustee) American Museum of Natural History (from 1975) and Institute of International Education. He was also a board member of the Center for Strategic and International Studies. Other appointments to a range of national and international agencies included serving on the Defense Science Board and serving as chair of the US delegation to the United Nations Committee on Science and Technology. He also served on the board of trustees of Science Service, now known as Society for Science & the Public, from 1971 to 1974.

In 1981, Seitz became a founding member of the World Cultural Council.

== Positions held ==
Academic

- Carnegie Tech, head of the physics department (1946–?)
- University of Illinois, professor of physics (1949–1964)
- American Institute of Physics, chairman (1954–1959)
- Academic Press, editor (1955–1984)
- North Atlantic Treaty Organization, (1959–1960)
- American Physical Society, chairman (1961)
- United States National Academy of Sciences, president (1962–1969)
- Rockefeller University, president emeritus (1968–1978)
- Physica Status Solidi B, editorial board member

Private sector

- George C. Marshall Institute, co-founder, chairman (1984–2001)
- Richard Lounsbery Foundation, president (1995–1997), chairman (since 1998)
- Science and Environmental Policy Project, chair (?–?)
- Advancement of Sound Science Center, member of advisory board

== Books ==
- Frederick Seitz, A matrix-algebraic development of the crystallographic groups, Princeton University, 1934
- Frederick Seitz, The modern theory of solids, McGraw-Hill, 1940
- Frederick Seitz, The physics of metals, McGraw-Hill, 1943
- Robert Jastrow, William Aaron Nierenberg, Frederick Seitz, Global warming: what does the science tell us?, George C. Marshall Institute, 1990
- Robert Jastrow, William Aaron Nierenberg, Frederick Seitz, Scientific perspectives on the greenhouse problem, Marshall Press, 1990
- Frederick Seitz, Francis Wheeler Loomis: August 4, 1889 – February 9, 1976, National Academy Press, 1991
- Frederick Seitz (1994). On the Frontier, My Life in Science. American Institute of Physics. ISBN 9781563961977. OCLC 231640410.
- Nikolaus Riehl and Frederick Seitz, Stalin's Captive: Nikolaus Riehl and the Soviet Race for the Bomb (American Chemical Society and the Chemical Heritage Foundations, 1996) ISBN 0-8412-3310-1.

This book is a translation of Nikolaus Riehl's book Zehn Jahre im goldenen Käfig (Ten Years in a Golden Cage) (Riederer-Verlag, 1988); but Seitz wrote a lengthy introduction. It contains 58 photographs.

- Frederick Seitz and Norman G. Einspruch, Electronic genie: the tangled history of silicon, University of Illinois Press, 1998.
- Frederick Seitz, The science matrix: the journey, travails, triumphs, Springer, 1998.
- Frederick Seitz, The cosmic inventor Reginald Aubrey Fessenden (1866–1932), American Philosophical Society, 1999
- Henry Ehrenreich, Frederick Seitz, David Turnbull, Frans Spaepen, Solid state physics, Academic Press, 2006
- Frederick Seitz, A selection of highlights from the history of the National Academy of Sciences, 1863–2005, University Press of America, 2007.

== See also ==
- Seitz's criticism of the Intergovernmental Panel on Climate Change: IPCC Second Assessment Report § Chapter 8: Detection of Climate Change and Attribution of Causes
- Wigner–Seitz radius
- Wigner–Seitz cell

Professional and academic associations
Preceded by Detlev Bronk	President of the National Academy of Sciences; 1962–1969	Succeeded by Philip Handler
Academic offices
Preceded by Detlev Bronk	President of the Rockefeller University; 1968–1978	Succeeded by Joshua Lederberg
