= Wendelin Morgenthaler =

German politician (1888–1963)

Member of the Bundestag; for Rastatt
- In office 7 September 1949 – 6 October 1957
- Preceded by: Constituency established
- Succeeded by: Ludwig Kroll

Personal details
- Born: 18 October 1888 Achern, Germany
- Died: 22 April 1963 (aged 74) Achern, West Germany
- Party: Christian Democratic Union

Wendelin Morgenthaler (18 October 1888 – 22 April 1963) was a German politician of the Christian Democratic Union (CDU) and member of the German Bundestag from 1949 to 1957.

== Life ==
After 1945 Morgenthaler joined the CDU. He was a member of the district council of the district of Bühl. He was a member of the German Bundestag from its first election in 1949 to 1957. He represented the Rastatt constituency in parliament as a directly elected member.

== Literature ==
Herbst, Ludolf; Jahn, Bruno (2002). Vierhaus, Rudolf (ed.). Biographisches Handbuch der Mitglieder des Deutschen Bundestages. 1949–2002 [Biographical Handbook of the Members of the German Bundestag. 1949–2002] (in German). München: De Gruyter - De Gruyter Saur. p. 1715. ISBN 978-3-11-184511-1.
