= Bernhard Friedmann =

German politician (1932–2021)

Member of the Bundestag; for Rastatt
- In office 14 December 1976 – 5 February 1990
- Preceded by: Hugo Hauser
- Succeeded by: Siegfried Hornung

Personal details
- Born: 8 April 1932 Ottersweier, Germany
- Died: 18 May 2021 (aged 89)
- Party: Christian Democratic Union
- Education: University of Freiburg; University of Fribourg

Bernhard Friedmann (8 April 1932 – 18 May 2021) was a German economist and politician of the Christian Democratic Union of Germany.

Friedmann was born in Ottersweier. He served as Member of Parliament (the Bundestag) from 1976 to 1990 and as member (1990–2001) and President (1996–1999) of the European Court of Auditors. He was also President of Studienzentrum Weikersheim (2005–2008).

== Honours ==
He was appointed honorary Professor of European Political Science at the University of Freiburg in 1995, and was awarded an honorary doctorate by the University of Sibiu (Hermannstadt) in Romania in 1997. He became an honorary citizen of his hometown of Ottersweier in 2002. He received the Euronatur-Umweltpreis environmental prize in 1997.

== Publications ==
- Einheit statt Raketen – Thesen zur Wiedervereinigung Deutschlands als Sicherheitskonzept. Busse und Seewald 1987, ISBN 3-512-00826-7
- Unternehmen Osteuropa – eine Herausforderung für die Europäische Gemeinschaft. Zur Notwendigkeit einer EG-Ostpolitik. Nomos 1994, ISBN 3-7890-3169-0, zusammen mit Christa Randzio-Plath
- Evaluierungsansätze zu ausgewählten Politikbereichen der Europäischen Union. Europa-Union Bonn 2001, ISBN 3-7713-0520-9
