= Oregon Petition =

Controversial 1998 petition skeptical of global warming

The Global Warming Petition Project, also known as the Oregon Petition, is a group which urges the United States federal government to reject the Kyoto Protocol of 1997 and similar policies. Their petition challenges the scientific consensus on climate change. Though the group claims more than thirty-thousand signatories across various scientific fields, the authenticity and methods of the petitioners as well as the signatories' credentials have been questioned, and the project has been characterized as a disinformation campaign engaged in climate change denial.

The petition was organized and circulated by Arthur B. Robinson, president of the Oregon Institute of Science and Medicine in 1998, and again in 2007. Robinson asserted in 2008 that the petition has over 31,000 signatories, with 9,000 of these holding a PhD degree. Most signatories with a PhD hold their degree in engineering. The list has been criticized for its lack of verification, with pranksters successfully submitting as signatories the names of the long-dead English naturalist Charles Darwin, the English musician Geri Halliwell (a member of the English girl group Spice Girls), and fictional characters from the media franchise Star Wars. All of these names were briefly included on the list. Robinson remarked that "When we're getting thousands of signatures there's no way of filtering out a fake".

== History and signatories ==
The petition was organized and circulated by Arthur B. Robinson, president of the Oregon Institute of Science and Medicine (described as "a small independent research group") in 1998, and again in 2007. Frederick Seitz, then chairman of the George C. Marshall Institute, wrote a supporting cover letter, signed as "Past President National Academy of Sciences USA, President Emeritus Rockefeller University". "In a highly unusual move, the National Academy held a press conference to disclaim the mailing and distance itself from its former president."

Robinson asserted in 2008 that the petition has over 31,000 signatories, with 9,000 of these holding a PhD degree. Most signatories with a PhD hold their degree in engineering. The 2009 report of the Nongovernmental International Panel on Climate Change (NIPCC)—a group that "disputes the reality of man-made climate change"—lists 31,478 degreed signatories, including 9,029 with PhDs. The list has been criticized for its lack of verification, with pranksters successfully submitting the names of Charles Darwin, a member of the Spice Girls and characters from Star Wars, and getting them briefly included on the list.

== Petition text ==
The text of the Global Warming Petition Project reads, in its entirety:

We urge the United States government to reject the global warming agreement that was written in Kyoto, Japan in December, 1997, and any other similar proposals. The proposed limits on greenhouse gases would harm the environment, hinder the advance of science and technology, and damage the health and welfare of mankind.

There is no convincing scientific evidence that human release of carbon dioxide, methane, or other greenhouse gases is causing or will, in the foreseeable future, cause catastrophic heating of the Earth's atmosphere and disruption of the Earth's climate. Moreover, there is substantial scientific evidence that increases in atmospheric carbon dioxide produce many beneficial effects upon the natural plant and animal environments of the Earth.

Along with the cover letter from Seitz (see above), the petition was circulated with a manuscript plus a reprint of a December 1997 Wall Street Journal op-ed ("Science Has Spoken: Global Warming Is a Myth") by Arthur and Zachary Robinson. The current version of Seitz's letter describes the summary as "a twelve page review of information on the subject of 'global warming'." The article is titled "Environmental Effects of Increased Atmospheric Carbon Dioxide" by Arthur B. Robinson, Noah E. Robinson, Sallie Baliunas and Willie Soon.

As of October 2007, the petition project website includes an article by Arthur Robinson, Noah E. Robinson and Willie Soon, published in 2007 in the Journal of American Physicians and Surgeons. The publication, which is not indexed alongside peer-reviewed journals, is the outlet of the Association of American Physicians and Surgeons, which is a libertarian political organization, and is associated with the Oregon Institute, which sponsored the petition.

== Signatories ==
The Oregon Petition Project clarified their verification process as follows:

- The petitioners could submit responses only by physical mail, not electronic mail, to limit fraud. Older signatures submitted via the web were not removed. The verification of the scientists was listed at 95%, but the means by which this verification was done was not specified.
- Signatories to the petition were requested to list an academic degree. The petition sponsors stated that approximately two thirds held higher degrees. As of 2013, the petition's website states, "The current list of 31,487 petition signers includes 9,029 PhD; 7,157 MS; 2,586 MD and DVM; and 12,715 BS or equivalent academic degrees. Most of the MD and DVM signers also have underlying degrees in basic science."
- Petitioners were also requested to list their academic discipline. As of 2007, about 2,400 people in addition to the original 17,100 signatories were "trained in fields other than science or whose field of specialization was not specified on their returned petition." The petition sponsors state the following numbers of individuals from each discipline:
  - Atmospheric, Environmental and Earth sciences: 3,805 (Climatology: 39)
  - Computer and Mathematical sciences: 935
  - Physics & Aerospace sciences: 5,812
  - Chemistry: 4,822
  - Biochemistry, Biology, and Agriculture: 2,965
  - Medicine: 3,046
  - Engineering and General Science: 10,102

=== Credentials and authenticity ===
The credentials, verification process, and authenticity of the signatories have been questioned.

Jeff Jacoby promoted the Oregon Institute petition as delegates convened for the United Nations Framework Convention on Climate Change in 1998. Jacoby, a columnist for The Boston Globe, said event organizers "take it for granted" that global warming is real when scientists do not agree "that greater concentrations of CO2 would be harmful" or "that human activity leads to global warming in the first place." George Woodwell and John Holdren, two members of the National Academy of Sciences, responded to Jacoby in the International Herald Tribune, describing the petition as a "farce" in part because "the signatories are listed without titles or affiliations that would permit an assessment of their credentials." Myanna Lahsen said, "Assuming that all the signatories reported their credentials accurately, credentialed climate experts on the list are very few." The problem is made worse, Lahsen notes, because critics "added bogus names to illustrate the lack of accountability the petition involved". Spurious names on the list included fictional characters from the television show M*A*S*H, the movie Star Wars, Spice Girls group member Geri Halliwell, English naturalist Charles Darwin (d. 1882) and prank names such as "I. C. Ewe". When questioned about the pop singer during a telephone interview with Joseph Hubert of the Associated Press, Robinson acknowledged that her endorsement and degree in microbiology was inauthentic, remarking "When we're getting thousands of signatures there's no way of filtering out a fake". A cursory examination by Todd Shelly of the Hawaii Reporter revealed duplicate entries, single names lacking any initial, and even corporate names. "These examples underscore a major weakness of the list: there is no way to check the authenticity of the names. Names are given, but no identifying information (e.g., institutional affiliation) is provided." According to the Petition Project website, the issue of duplication has been resolved. Kevin Grandia offered similar criticism, saying that, although the Petition Project website provides a breakdown of "areas of expertise", it fails to assort the 0.5% of signatories who claim to have a background in Climatology and Atmospheric Science by name, making independent verification difficult. "This makes an already questionable list seem completely insignificant".

In 2001, Scientific American took a random sample "of 30 of the 1,400 signatories claiming to hold a Ph.D. in a climate-related science."

Of the 26 we were able to identify in various databases, 11 said they still agreed with the petition — one was an active climate researcher, two others had relevant expertise, and eight signed based on an informal evaluation. Six said they would not sign the petition today, three did not remember any such petition, one had died, and five did not answer repeated messages. Crudely extrapolating, the petition supporters include a core of about 200 climate researchers – a respectable number, though rather a small fraction of the climatological community.

Former New Scientist correspondent Peter Hadfield said that scientists are not experts on every topic, as depicted by the character Brains in Thunderbirds. Rather, they must specialize:

In between Aaagard and Zylkowski, the first and last names on the petition, are an assortment of metallurgists, botanists, agronomists, organic chemists and so on. ... The vast majority of scientists who signed the petition have never studied climatology and don't do any research into it. It doesn't matter if you're a Ph.D. A Ph.D in metallurgy just makes you better at metallurgy. It does not transform you into some kind of expert in paleoclimatology. ... So the petition's suggestion that everyone with a degree in metallurgy or geophysics knows a lot about climate change, or is familiar with all the research that's been done, is patent crap.

== NAS incident ==
A manuscript accompanying the petition was presented in a near identical style and format to contributions that appear in Proceedings of the National Academy of Sciences, a scientific journal, but upon careful examination was distinct from a publication by the U.S. National Academy of Sciences. Raymond Pierrehumbert, an atmospheric scientist at the University of Chicago, said the presentation was "designed to be deceptive by giving people the impression that the article … is a reprint and has passed peer review." Pierrehumbert also said the publication was full of "half-truths". F. Sherwood Rowland, who was at the time foreign secretary of the National Academy of Sciences, said that the Academy received numerous inquiries from researchers who "are wondering if someone is trying to hoodwink them."

After the petition appeared, the National Academy of Sciences said in a 1998 news release that "The NAS Council would like to make it clear that this petition has nothing to do with the National Academy of Sciences and that the manuscript was not published in the Proceedings of the National Academy of Sciences or in any other peer-reviewed journal." It also said "The petition does not reflect the conclusions of expert reports of the Academy." The NAS further noted that its own prior published study had shown that "even given the considerable uncertainties in our knowledge of the relevant phenomena, greenhouse warming poses a potential threat sufficient to merit prompt responses. Investment in mitigation measures acts as insurance protection against the great uncertainties and the possibility of dramatic surprises."

Robinson responded in a 1998 article in Science, "I used the Proceedings as a model, but only to put the information in a format that scientists like to read, not to fool people into thinking it is from a journal." A 2006 article in the magazine Vanity Fair stated:

Today, Seitz admits that "it was stupid" for the Oregon activists to copy the academy's format. Still, he doesn't understand why the academy felt compelled to disavow the petition, which he continues to cite as proof that it is "not true" there is a scientific consensus on global warming.

== See also ==
- Leipzig Declaration
- An Evangelical Declaration on Global Warming
- Climate change denial
- Global warming controversy
- Global Warming Policy Foundation
- Heartland Institute
- Public opinion on climate change
- Scientific opinion on climate change
