= Studienzentrum Weikersheim =

German conservative think tank

Studienzentrum Weikersheim (Weikersheim Think Tank) is a conservative and Christian democratic German political think tank, that was founded in 1979 by Hans Filbinger, Helmut Metzner and others on Schloss Weikersheim in Germany. The Studienzentrum is bringing traditional conservative ideas with positions and people of Neue Rechte (new far-rights).

== Presidents ==
- Hans Filbinger, Professor, former Minister-President of Baden-Württemberg (1979-1997, honorary president 1997-2007)
- Wolfgang von Stetten, Professor, Member of Parliament (1997-2001)
- Klaus Hornung, Professor (2001-2005)
- Bernhard Friedmann, Professor, former President of the Court of Auditors (2005-2008)
- Bernhard von Diemer (2008-)

== Literature ==
- Meinrad Heck: Studienzentrum Weikersheim. Der Club der rechten Denker. In: Stephan Braun, Daniel Hoersch (Hrsg.): Rechte Netzwerke - eine Gefahr. VS Verlag für Sozialwissenschaften, Wiesbaden 2004, S.95-101. ISBN 3-8100-4153-X
- Wolfram Wette (Hrsg.): Filbinger, eine deutsche Karriere. Klampen-Verlag, Springe 2006, ISBN 3-934920-74-8
- Ursel Sieber, Charlotte Wiedemann, Jürgen Elsässer: Deutsche Demokraten. Wie rechtsradikal sind CDU und CSU? Werkstatt GmbH 2001, ISBN 3-923478-94-1
