= Gabriele Katzmarek =

German politician (born 1960)

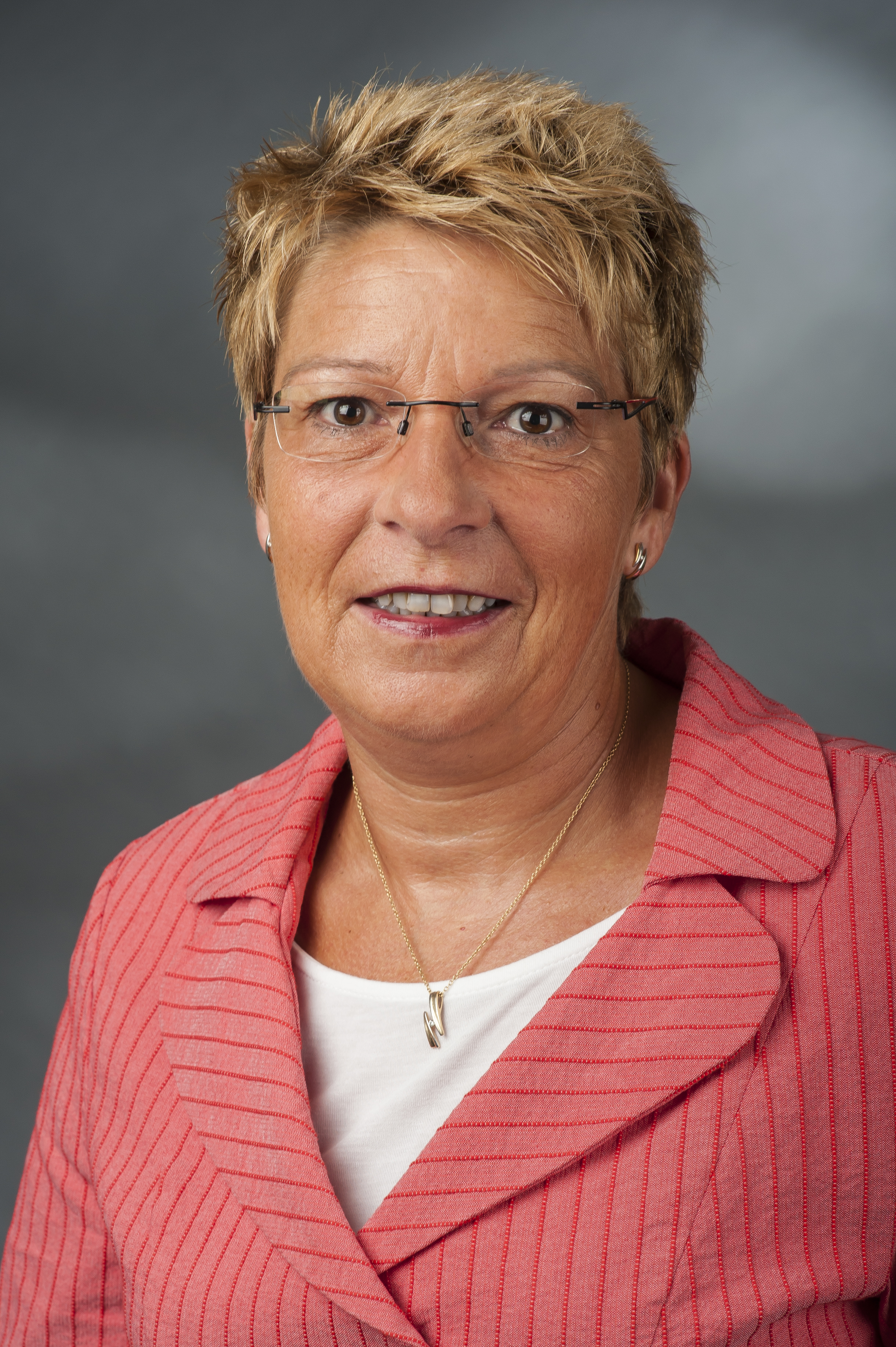

Member of the Bundestag
- Incumbent
- Assumed office 2013

Personal details
- Born: 8 July 1960 (age 65) Marl, West Germany (now Germany)
- Party: SPD

Gabriele Katzmarek (born 8 July 1960) is a German trade unionist and politician of the Social Democratic Party (SPD) who has been serving as a member of the Bundestag from the state of Baden-Württemberg since 2013.

== Political career ==
Katzmarek first became a member of the Bundestag in the 2013 German federal election. She is a member of the Committee on Economic Affairs and Energy. In 2019, she was elected as one of her parliamentary group’s whips, under the leadership of chairman Rolf Mützenich. In this capacity, she also joined the parliament’s Council of Elders, which – among other duties – determines daily legislative agenda items and assigns committee chairpersons based on party representation.

In addition to her committee assignments, Katzmarek is part of the German Parliamentary Friendship Group for Relations with the States of South Asia.

In the negotiations to form a so-called traffic light coalition of the SPD, the Green Party and the Free Democratic Party (FDP) following the 2021 federal elections, Katzmarek was part of her party's delegation in the working group on economic affairs, co-chaired by Carsten Schneider, Cem Özdemir and Michael Theurer.

In July 2024 she announced that she isn't seeking re-election for Bundestag.

== Other activities ==
- German Health Partnership (GHP), Member of the Advisory Board (since 2017)
- Federal Network Agency for Electricity, Gas, Telecommunications, Post and Railway (BNetzA), Alternate Member of the Advisory Board
- IG BCE, Member
