= Photosynthetica =

- Discipline: Photosynthesis
- Language: English
- Edited by: Helena Synkova

Publication details
- History: 1967–present
- Publisher: Institute of Experimental Botany (Academy of Sciences of the Czech Republic)
- Frequency: Quarterly
- Open access: Yes
- Impact factor: 2.482 (2021)

Standard abbreviations
- ISO 4: Photosynthetica

Indexing
- CODEN: PHSYB5
- ISSN: 0300-3604 (print); 1573-9058 (web)
- LCCN: sf78000716
- OCLC no.: 807153966

Links
- Journal homepage; Online access; Online archive

Photosynthetica is a quarterly peer-reviewed scientific journal covering research on photosynthesis. It was established in 1967 and is published by the Institute of Experimental Botany of the Academy of Sciences of the Czech Republic. The editor-in-chief is Helena Synkova (Academy of Sciences of the Czech Republic). Up till 2019, the journal was published by Springer Science+Business Media.

== Abstracting and indexing ==
The journal is abstracted and indexed in:

- AGRICOLA
- Biological Abstracts
- BIOSIS Previews
- CAB databases
- Chemical Abstracts Service
- CSA databases
- Current Contents/Agriculture, Biology & Environmental Sciences
- EBSCO databases
- Elsevier Biobase
- EMBiology
- INIS Atomindex
- ProQuest databases
- Referativnyi Zhurnal
- Science Citation Index
- Scopus

According to the Journal Citation Reports, the journal has a 2019 impact factor of 2.562.
