= Omoglymmius cupedoides =

Scientific classification
- Kingdom: Animalia
- Phylum: Arthropoda
- Class: Insecta
- Order: Coleoptera
- Suborder: Adephaga
- Family: Carabidae
- Genus: Omoglymmius
- Species: O. cupedoides

Binomial name
- Omoglymmius cupedoides R.T. Bell & J.R. Bell, 1993

Species of beetle

Omoglymmius cupedoides is a species of beetle in the subfamily Rhysodinae. It was described by R.T. Bell & J.R. Bell in 1993. It is known from Madang, Papua New Guinea, where it was collected in 1896.

Omoglymmius cupedoides measure 7 mm (0.28 in) in length.
