= Omoglymmius peckorum =

Scientific classification
- Kingdom: Animalia
- Phylum: Arthropoda
- Class: Insecta
- Order: Coleoptera
- Suborder: Adephaga
- Family: Carabidae
- Genus: Omoglymmius
- Species: O. peckorum

Binomial name
- Omoglymmius peckorum R.T. Bell & J.R. Bell, 1985

Species of beetle

Omoglymmius peckorum is a species of beetle in the subfamily Rhysodidae. It was described by R.T. Bell and J.R. Bell in 1985. It is known from Viti Levu, Fiji. It is named after the collectors of the type series, S. and J. Peck.

Omoglymmius peckorum measure 5.5 mm (0.22 in) in length.
