= Omoglymmius astraea =

Scientific classification
- Kingdom: Animalia
- Phylum: Arthropoda
- Clade: Pancrustacea
- Class: Insecta
- Order: Coleoptera
- Suborder: Adephaga
- Family: Carabidae
- Genus: Omoglymmius
- Species: O. astraea

Binomial name
- Omoglymmius astraea R.T. Bell & J.R. Bell, 1988 (Note: Year given as 1987 in the Catalogue of Life.)

Species of beetle

Omoglymmius astraea is a species of beetle in the subfamily Rhysodinae. It was described by R.T. Bell & J.R. Bell in 1988. It is known from Mount Muajat (1,780 m (5,840 ft) asl) in North Sulawesi (Indonesia).

Omoglymmius astraea measure 5.9–6.3 mm (0.23–0.25 in) in length.
