= Omoglymmius multicarinatus =

Scientific classification
- Kingdom: Animalia
- Phylum: Arthropoda
- Clade: Pancrustacea
- Class: Insecta
- Order: Coleoptera
- Suborder: Adephaga
- Family: Carabidae
- Genus: Omoglymmius
- Species: O. multicarinatus

Binomial name
- Omoglymmius multicarinatus R.T. Bell & J.R. Bell, 1993

Species of beetle

Omoglymmius multicarinatus is a species of beetle in the subfamily Rhysodinae. It was described by R.T. Bell & J.R. Bell in 1993. It is known from the northern peninsula of Sulawesi, Indonesia.

Omoglymmius multicarinatus holotype, a female, measures 7.8 mm (0.31 in) in length and was collected in lowland forest.
