= Omoglymmius cycloderus =

Scientific classification
- Kingdom: Animalia
- Phylum: Arthropoda
- Class: Insecta
- Order: Coleoptera
- Suborder: Adephaga
- Family: Carabidae
- Genus: Omoglymmius
- Species: O. cycloderus

Binomial name
- Omoglymmius cycloderus R.T. Bell & J.R. Bell, 2002

Species of beetle

Omoglymmius cycloderus is a species of beetle in the subfamily Rhysodidae. It was described by R.T. Bell and J.R. Bell in 2002. It is known from Batanta Island (West Papua, Indonesia).

Omoglymmius cycloderus holotype, a male, measures 5.5 mm (0.22 in) in length.
