= Omoglymmius craticulus =

Scientific classification
- Kingdom: Animalia
- Phylum: Arthropoda
- Class: Insecta
- Order: Coleoptera
- Suborder: Adephaga
- Family: Carabidae
- Genus: Omoglymmius
- Species: O. craticulus

Binomial name
- Omoglymmius craticulus R.T. Bell & J.R. Bell, 1985

Species of beetle

Omoglymmius craticulus is a species of beetle in the subfamily Rhysodidae. It was described by R.T. Bell and J.R. Bell in 1985. It is known from Moroto, southeastern New Guinea (Papua New Guinea).

Omoglymmius craticulus holotype, a female, measures 7 mm (0.28 in) in length.
