= Omoglymmius gressitti =

Scientific classification
- Kingdom: Animalia
- Phylum: Arthropoda
- Class: Insecta
- Order: Coleoptera
- Suborder: Adephaga
- Family: Carabidae
- Genus: Omoglymmius
- Species: O. gressitti

Binomial name
- Omoglymmius gressitti R.T. Bell & J.R. Bell, 1985

Species of beetle

Omoglymmius gressitti is a species of beetle in the subfamily Rhysodidae. It was described by R.T. Bell and J.R. Bell in 1985. It is known from Mount Missim near Wau, Papua New Guinea. It is named for J. L. Gressitt and his wife, Margaret, "for their kind hospitality and assistance on our field trip to the Wau Ecological Institute".

Omoglymmius gressitti holotype, a male, measures 7.9 mm (0.31 in) in length.
