= Omoglymmius ferrugatus =

Scientific classification
- Kingdom: Animalia
- Phylum: Arthropoda
- Class: Insecta
- Order: Coleoptera
- Suborder: Adephaga
- Family: Carabidae
- Genus: Omoglymmius
- Species: O. ferrugatus

Binomial name
- Omoglymmius ferrugatus R.T. Bell & J.R. Bell, 1988 (Note: Year given as 1987 in the Catalogue of Life.)

Species of beetle

Omoglymmius ferrugatus is a species of beetle in the subfamily Rhysodinae. It was described by R.T. Bell & J.R. Bell in 1988. It is known from Potil Kecil in Banggai Archipelago, east of Sulawesi (Indonesia).

Omoglymmius ferrugatus holotype, a male, measures 7 mm (0.28 in) in length and was collected under bark of a fallen tree.
