= Omoglymmius brendelli =

Scientific classification
- Kingdom: Animalia
- Phylum: Arthropoda
- Clade: Pancrustacea
- Class: Insecta
- Order: Coleoptera
- Suborder: Adephaga
- Family: Carabidae
- Genus: Omoglymmius
- Species: O. brendelli

Binomial name
- Omoglymmius brendelli R.T. Bell & J.R. Bell, 1988 (Note: Year given as 1987 in the Catalogue of Life.)

Species of beetle

Omoglymmius brendelli is a species of beetle in the subfamily Rhysodinae. It was described by R.T. Bell & J.R. Bell in 1988. It is known from the central part of Sulawesi (Indonesia), near the Gulf of Tolo. The specific name brendelli honors M. J. D. Brendell, collector of the holotype.

Omoglymmius brendelli holotype, a female, measures 5.7 mm (0.22 in) in length and was obtained from a rotten log.
