= Omoglymmius largus =

Scientific classification
- Kingdom: Animalia
- Phylum: Arthropoda
- Class: Insecta
- Order: Coleoptera
- Suborder: Adephaga
- Family: Carabidae
- Genus: Omoglymmius
- Species: O. largus

Binomial name
- Omoglymmius largus R.T. Bell & J.R. Bell, 1985

Species of beetle

Omoglymmius largus is a species of beetle in the subfamily Rhysodidae. It was described by R.T. Bell and J.R. Bell in 1985. It is known from the Fly River, New Guinea. (Note: The river runs in both Papua-New Guinean and Indonesian (West Papuan) parts of the island.)

Omoglymmius largus holotype, a female, measures 7.2 mm (0.28 in) in length.
