= Omoglymmius seriatus =

Scientific classification
- Kingdom: Animalia
- Phylum: Arthropoda
- Clade: Pancrustacea
- Class: Insecta
- Order: Coleoptera
- Suborder: Adephaga
- Family: Carabidae
- Genus: Omoglymmius
- Species: O. seriatus

Binomial name
- Omoglymmius seriatus R.T. Bell & J.R. Bell, 1988 (Note: Year given as 1987 in the Catalogue of Life.)

Species of beetle

Omoglymmius seriatus is a species of beetle in the subfamily Rhysodinae. It was described by R.T. Bell & J.R. Bell in 1988. It is known from Mount Tambusisi in Central Sulawesi (Indonesia), near the Gulf of Tomini.

Omoglymmius seriatus holotype, a female, measures 6 mm (0.24 in) in length and was collected from under bark of a tree.
