= Omoglymmius sabah =

Scientific classification
- Kingdom: Animalia
- Phylum: Arthropoda
- Class: Insecta
- Order: Coleoptera
- Suborder: Adephaga
- Family: Carabidae
- Genus: Omoglymmius
- Species: O. sabah

Binomial name
- Omoglymmius sabah R.T. Bell & J.R. Bell, 1993

Species of beetle

Omoglymmius sabah is a species of beetle in the subfamily Rhysodinae. It was described by R.T. Bell & J.R. Bell in 1993. It is known from Mount Kinabalu in Sabah, Malaysian Borneo. The type series was collected at elevations of 500–900 m (1,600–3,000 ft) above sea level.

Omoglymmius sabah measure 5.8–6.5 mm (0.23–0.26 in) in length.
