= Omoglymmius lentus =

Scientific classification
- Kingdom: Animalia
- Phylum: Arthropoda
- Class: Insecta
- Order: Coleoptera
- Suborder: Adephaga
- Family: Carabidae
- Genus: Omoglymmius
- Species: O. lentus

Binomial name
- Omoglymmius lentus R.T. Bell & J.R. Bell, 1982

Species of beetle

Omoglymmius lentus is a species of beetle in the subfamily Rhysodidae. It was described by R.T. & J.R. Bell in 1982.
