= Omoglymmius opacus =

Scientific classification
- Kingdom: Animalia
- Phylum: Arthropoda
- Class: Insecta
- Order: Coleoptera
- Suborder: Adephaga
- Family: Carabidae
- Genus: Omoglymmius
- Species: O. opacus

Binomial name
- Omoglymmius opacus R.T. Bell & J.R. Bell, 1985

Species of beetle

Omoglymmius opacus is a species of beetle in the subfamily Rhysodidae. It was described by R.T. Bell and J.R. Bell in 1985. It is known from Padang, Sumatra (Indonesia).

Omoglymmius opacus holotype, a female, measures 9 mm (0.35 in) in length.
