= Omoglymmius wallacei =

Scientific classification
- Kingdom: Animalia
- Phylum: Arthropoda
- Clade: Pancrustacea
- Class: Insecta
- Order: Coleoptera
- Suborder: Adephaga
- Family: Carabidae
- Genus: Omoglymmius
- Species: O. wallacei

Binomial name
- Omoglymmius wallacei R.T. Bell & J.R. Bell, 1988 (Note: Year given as 1987 in the Catalogue of Life.)

Species of beetle

Omoglymmius wallacei is a species of beetle in the subfamily Rhysodinae. It was described by R.T. Bell & J.R. Bell in 1988. It is known from lower montane forest on Mount Ambang near Kotamobagu, North Sulawesi (Indonesia). The specific name commemorates Alfred Russel Wallace, pioneering scientist who worked in the region, as well as "Project Wallace", during which the type series was collected (1985).

Omoglymmius wallacei measure 6.7–8.3 mm (0.26–0.33 in) in length.
