= Omoglymmius tolai =

Scientific classification
- Kingdom: Animalia
- Phylum: Arthropoda
- Class: Insecta
- Order: Coleoptera
- Suborder: Adephaga
- Family: Carabidae
- Genus: Omoglymmius
- Species: O. tolai

Binomial name
- Omoglymmius tolai R.T. Bell & J.R. Bell, 1985

Species of beetle

Omoglymmius tolai is a species of beetle in the subfamily Rhysodidae. It was described by R.T. Bell and J.R. Bell in 1985. It is known from New Britain (Bismarck Archipelago, Papua New Guinea).

Omoglymmius tolai measure 6.7–7.2 mm (0.26–0.28 in) in length.
