= Lepidophloeus minusculus =

Scientific classification
- Domain: Eukaryota
- Kingdom: Animalia
- Phylum: Arthropoda
- Class: Insecta
- Order: Coleoptera
- Suborder: Polyphaga
- Infraorder: Cucujiformia
- Family: Laemophloeidae
- Genus: Lepidophloeus
- Species: L. minusculus

Binomial name
- Lepidophloeus minusculus (Grouvelle, 1876)

Species of beetle

Lepidophloeus minusculus is a species of beetle in the genus Lepidophloeus. It was discovered in 1876 by French entomologist Antoine Henri Grouvelle.
