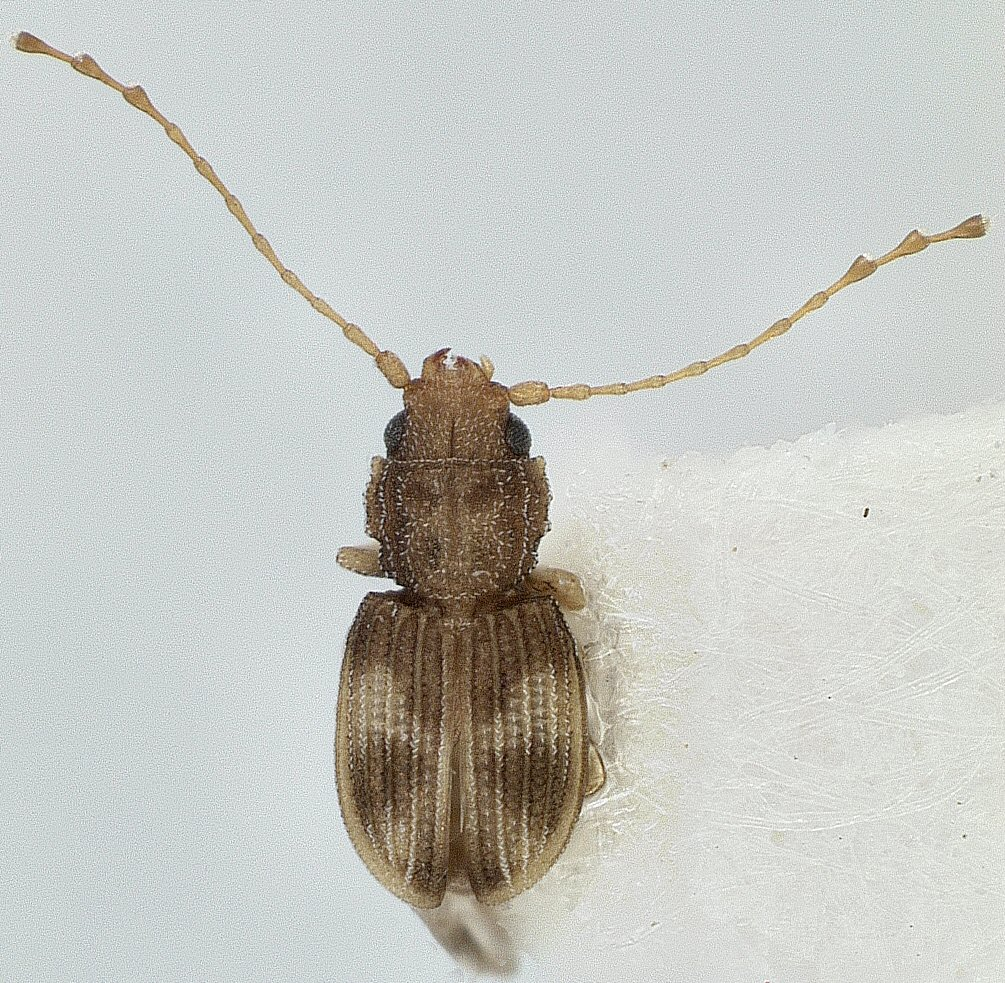

Scientific classification
- Kingdom: Animalia
- Phylum: Arthropoda
- Clade: Pancrustacea
- Class: Insecta
- Order: Coleoptera
- Suborder: Polyphaga
- Infraorder: Cucujiformia
- Superfamily: Cucujoidea
- Family: Laemophloeidae
- Genus: Lepidophloeus
- Species: L. exquisitus

Binomial name
- Lepidophloeus exquisitus (Grouvelle, 1908)

Synonyms
- Laemophloeus exquisitus Grouvelle, 1908

= Lepidophloeus exquisitus =

Species of beetle

Lepidophloeus exquisitus is a species of beetle in the family Laemophloeidae. It was described in 1906 by French entomologist Antoine Henri Grouvelle. It occurs on the Lesser Antilles.
