= Omoglymmius gracilicornis =

Scientific classification
- Kingdom: Animalia
- Phylum: Arthropoda
- Class: Insecta
- Order: Coleoptera
- Suborder: Adephaga
- Family: Carabidae
- Genus: Omoglymmius
- Species: O. gracilicornis

Binomial name
- Omoglymmius gracilicornis (Grouvelle, 1895)

Species of beetle

Omoglymmius gracilicornis is a species of beetle in the subfamily Rhysodidae. It was described by Grouvelle in 1895.
