= Omoglymmius lineatus =

Scientific classification
- Kingdom: Animalia
- Phylum: Arthropoda
- Class: Insecta
- Order: Coleoptera
- Suborder: Adephaga
- Family: Carabidae
- Genus: Omoglymmius
- Species: O. lineatus

Binomial name
- Omoglymmius lineatus (Grouvelle, 1908)

Species of beetle

Omoglymmius lineatus is a species of beetle in the subfamily Rhysodidae. It was described by Grouvelle in 1908.
