= Omoglymmius cavifrons =

Scientific classification
- Kingdom: Animalia
- Phylum: Arthropoda
- Class: Insecta
- Order: Coleoptera
- Suborder: Adephaga
- Family: Carabidae
- Genus: Omoglymmius
- Species: O. cavifrons

Binomial name
- Omoglymmius cavifrons (Grouvelle, 1914)

Synonyms
- Rhysodes cavifrons Grouvelle, 1914

Species of beetle

Omoglymmius cavifrons is a species of ground beetle in the subfamily Rhysodinae. It was described by Antoine Henri Grouvelle in 1914. It is found in Taiwan and on Okinawa (Ryukyu Islands, Japan).
