= Omoglymmius alticola =

Scientific classification
- Kingdom: Animalia
- Phylum: Arthropoda
- Class: Insecta
- Order: Coleoptera
- Suborder: Adephaga
- Family: Carabidae
- Genus: Omoglymmius
- Species: O. alticola

Binomial name
- Omoglymmius alticola (Grouvelle, 1913)

Species of beetle

Omoglymmius alticola is a species of beetle in the subfamily Rhysodidae. It was described by Grouvelle in 1913.
