= Omoglymmius africanus =

Scientific classification
- Kingdom: Animalia
- Phylum: Arthropoda
- Class: Insecta
- Order: Coleoptera
- Suborder: Adephaga
- Family: Carabidae
- Genus: Omoglymmius
- Species: O. africanus

Binomial name
- Omoglymmius africanus (Grouvelle, 1892)

Species of beetle

Omoglymmius africanus is a species of beetle in the subfamily Rhysodinae. It was described by Grouvelle in 1892.
