= Omoglymmius feae =

Scientific classification
- Kingdom: Animalia
- Phylum: Arthropoda
- Class: Insecta
- Order: Coleoptera
- Suborder: Adephaga
- Family: Carabidae
- Genus: Omoglymmius
- Species: O. feae

Binomial name
- Omoglymmius feae (Grouvelle, 1895)

Species of beetle

Omoglymmius feae is a species of beetle in the subfamily Rhysodidae. It was described by Antoine Henri Grouvelle in 1895. It is known from the type series collected by Leonardo Fea in Myanmar in 1888.
