= Microtis =

Microtis, Latin for "small-eared" is the generic name of two groups of organisms. It can refer to:

- Microtis (gastropod) in the family Trochidae
- Microtis (plant) in the family Orchidaceae

== See also ==
- Atelocynus microtis, a mammal species
- Brucella micotis, a species of Gram-negative bacteria
- Felis microtis, a synonym of Prionailurus bengalensis, leopard cat
- Graphiurus microtis, a rodent species
- Lepus microtis, a mammal species
- Lerista microtis, a lizard species
- Mantidactylus microtis, a frog species
- Micronycteris microtis, a bat species
- Microtus, a genus of voles
- Nyctophilus microtis, a bat species
- Oligoryzomys microtis, a rodent species
- Omoglymmius microtis, a beetle species
