= Omoglymmius laticeps =

Scientific classification
- Kingdom: Animalia
- Phylum: Arthropoda
- Class: Insecta
- Order: Coleoptera
- Suborder: Adephaga
- Family: Carabidae
- Genus: Omoglymmius
- Species: O. laticeps

Binomial name
- Omoglymmius laticeps R.T. Bell, 1977

Species of beetle

Omoglymmius laticeps is a species of beetle in the subfamily Rhysodidae. It was described by R.T.Bell in 1977.
