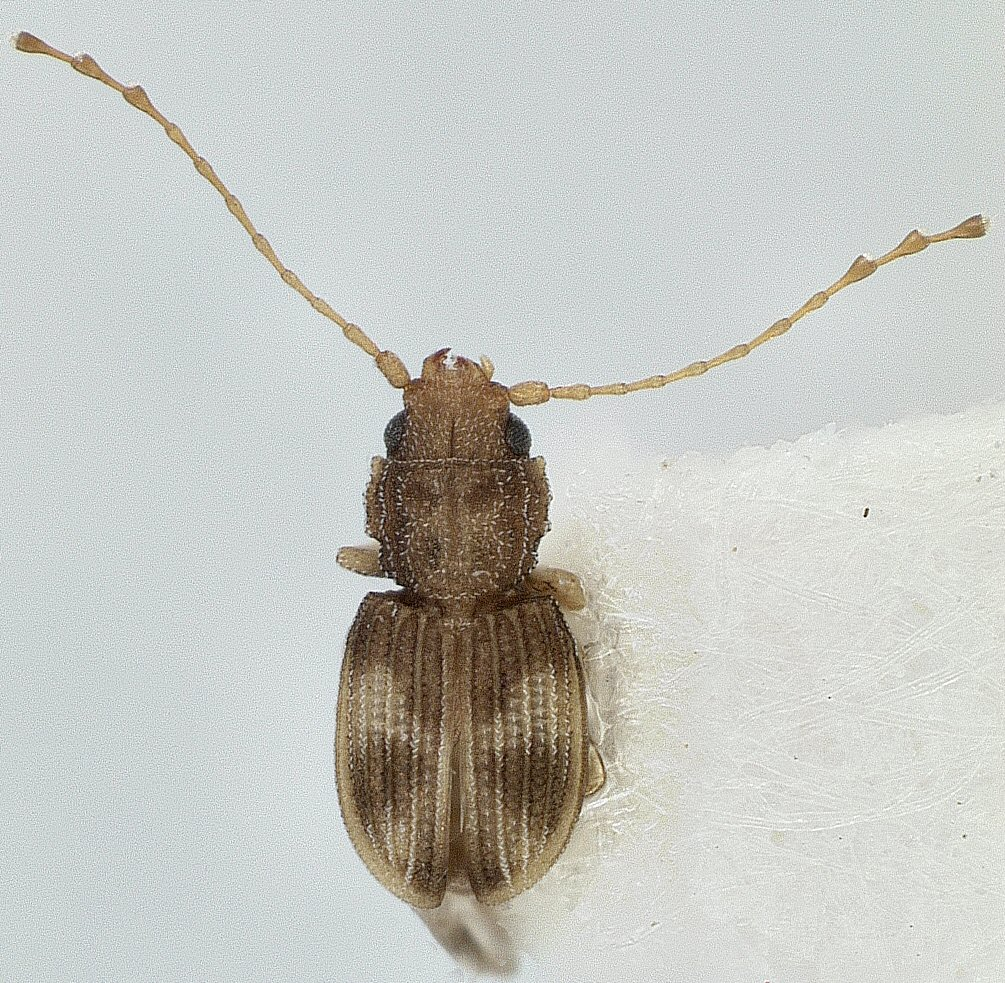

Scientific classification
- Domain: Eukaryota
- Kingdom: Animalia
- Phylum: Arthropoda
- Class: Insecta
- Order: Coleoptera
- Suborder: Polyphaga
- Infraorder: Cucujiformia
- Superfamily: Cucujoidea
- Family: Laemophloeidae
- Genus: Lepidophloeus; Thomas, 1984

= Lepidophloeus =

Genus of beetles

Lepidophloeus is a genus of beetles in the family Laemophloeidae, containing the following species:

- Lepidophloeus exquisitus Grouvelle
- Lepidophloeus minusculus Grouvelle
