= Omoglymmius cheesmanae =

Scientific classification
- Kingdom: Animalia
- Phylum: Arthropoda
- Class: Insecta
- Order: Coleoptera
- Suborder: Adephaga
- Family: Carabidae
- Genus: Omoglymmius
- Species: O. cheesmanae

Binomial name
- Omoglymmius cheesmanae (Arrow, 1942)

Species of beetle

Omoglymmius cheesmanae is a species of beetle in the subfamily Rhysodidae. It was described by Arrow in 1942.
