= Omoglymmius philippinensis =

Scientific classification
- Kingdom: Animalia
- Phylum: Arthropoda
- Class: Insecta
- Order: Coleoptera
- Suborder: Adephaga
- Family: Carabidae
- Genus: Omoglymmius
- Species: O. philippinensis

Binomial name
- Omoglymmius philippinensis (Chevrolat, 1875)

Species of beetle

Omoglymmius philippinensis is a species of beetle in the subfamily Rhysodidae. It was described by Louis Alexandre Auguste Chevrolat in 1875.
