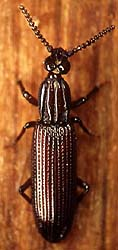

Scientific classification
- Kingdom: Animalia
- Phylum: Arthropoda
- Class: Insecta
- Order: Coleoptera
- Suborder: Adephaga
- Family: Carabidae
- Genus: Omoglymmius
- Species: O. hamatus

Binomial name
- Omoglymmius hamatus (LeConte, 1875)

= Omoglymmius hamatus =

Species of beetle

Omoglymmius hamatus is a species of beetle in the family Rhysodidae. It was described by John Lawrence LeConte in 1875. Its common name is the wrinkled bark beetle, though this name can refer to the entire family.

This beetle can be found in Washington, Oregon, Idaho, and California in the United States. It makes its home in fallen logs in mountainous areas.

The adult is between 6 and 7 millimeters long.
