= Omoglymmius strabus =

Scientific classification
- Kingdom: Animalia
- Phylum: Arthropoda
- Class: Insecta
- Order: Coleoptera
- Suborder: Adephaga
- Family: Carabidae
- Genus: Omoglymmius
- Species: O. strabus

Binomial name
- Omoglymmius strabus (E. Newman, 1838)

Species of beetle

Omoglymmius strabus is a species of beetle in the subfamily Rhysodidae. It was described by Edward Newman in 1838.
