= Omoglymmius coomani =

Scientific classification
- Kingdom: Animalia
- Phylum: Arthropoda
- Class: Insecta
- Order: Coleoptera
- Suborder: Adephaga
- Family: Carabidae
- Genus: Omoglymmius
- Species: O. coomani

Binomial name
- Omoglymmius coomani (Arrow, 1942)

Species of beetle

Omoglymmius coomani is a species of beetle in the subfamily Rhysodidae. It was described by Arrow in 1942.
