= Omoglymmius sakuraii =

Scientific classification
- Kingdom: Animalia
- Phylum: Arthropoda
- Class: Insecta
- Order: Coleoptera
- Suborder: Adephaga
- Family: Carabidae
- Genus: Omoglymmius
- Species: O. sakuraii

Binomial name
- Omoglymmius sakuraii (Nakane, 1978)

Species of beetle

Omoglymmius sakuraii is a species of beetle in the subfamily Rhysodidae. It was described by Nakane in 1978.
