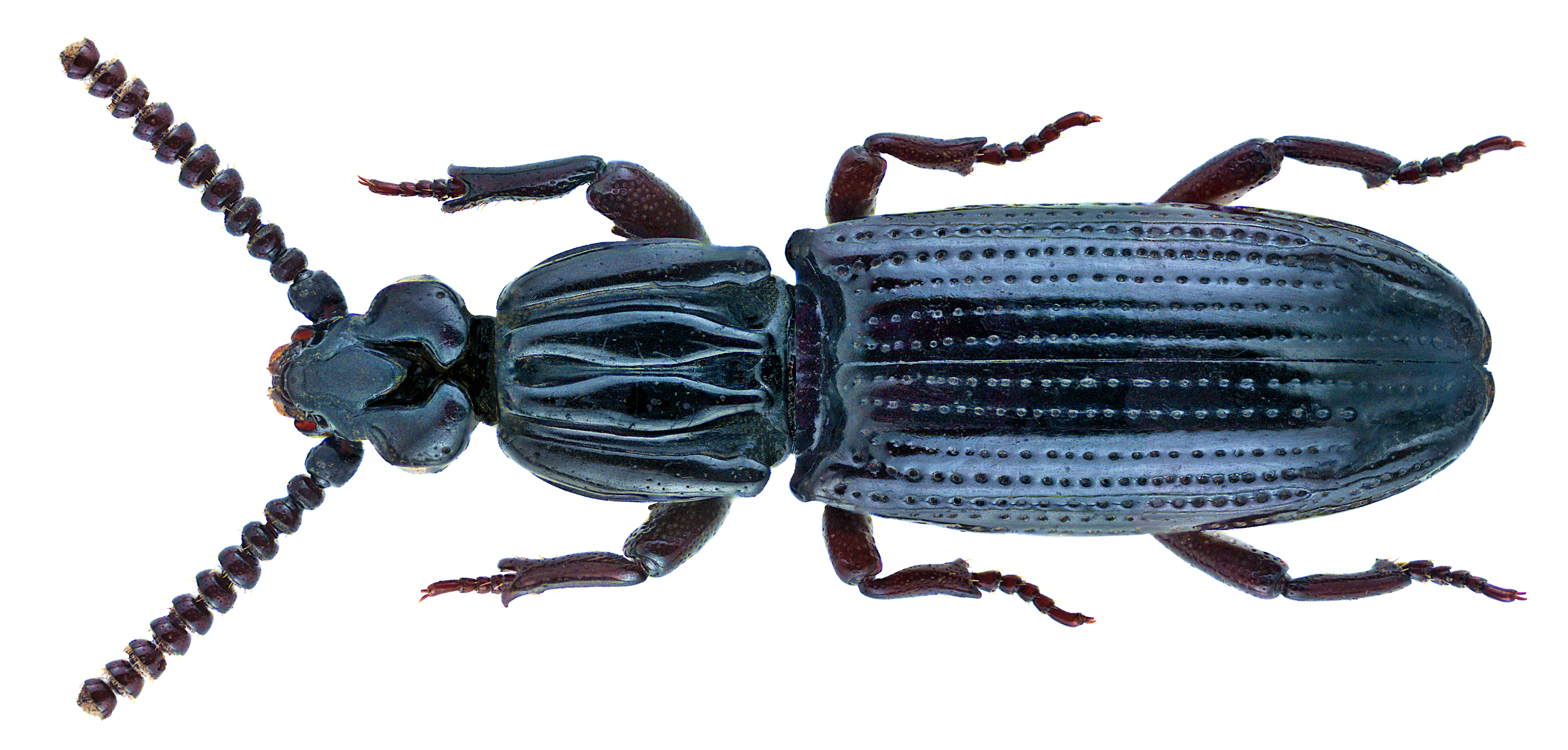
- Omoglymmius batchianus

Scientific classification
- Kingdom: Animalia
- Phylum: Arthropoda
- Class: Insecta
- Order: Coleoptera
- Suborder: Adephaga
- Family: Carabidae
- Subfamily: Rhysodinae
- Genus: Omoglymmius; Ganglbauer, 1891

= Omoglymmius =

Genus of beetles

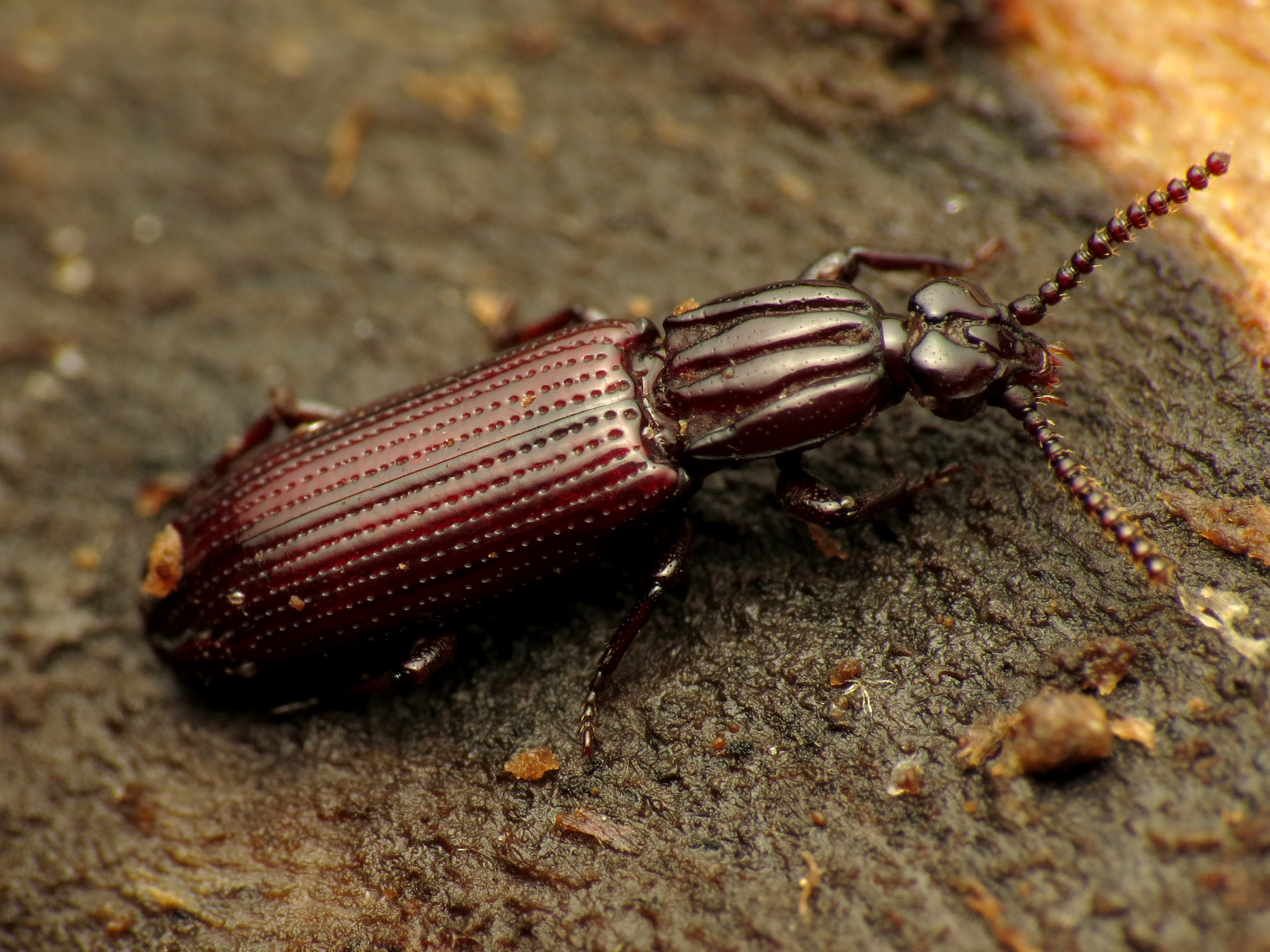
Omoglymmius americanus, Washington, DC

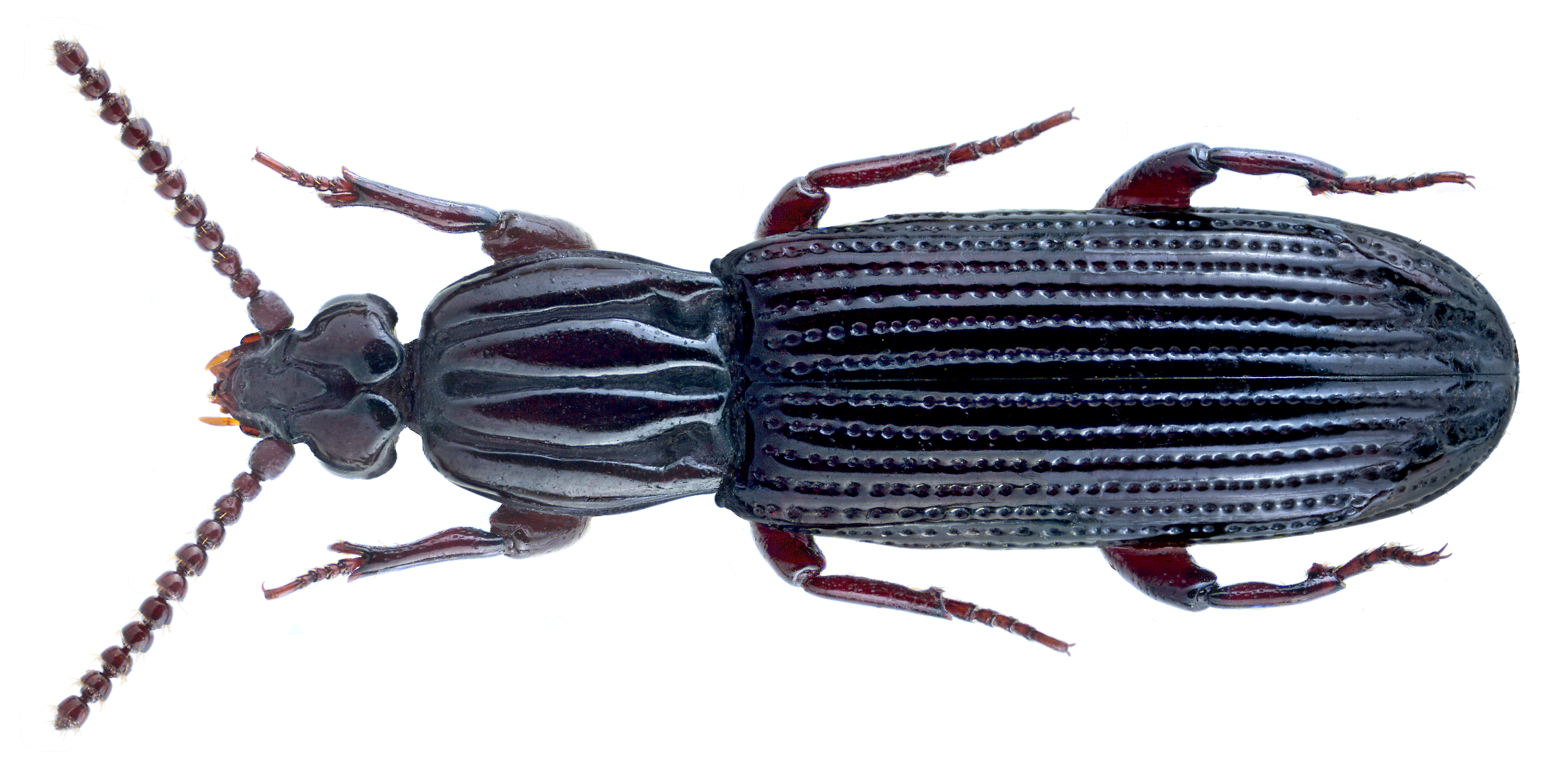
Omoglymmius germari

Omoglymmius is a genus in the ground beetle subfamily Rhysodinae. There are more than 150 described species in Omoglymmius, found on every continent except Antarctica.

== Species ==
These 157 species belong to the genus Omoglymmius:

Subgenus Boreoglymmius R.T. & J.R.Bell, 1983
Omoglymmius americanus (Laporte, 1836) - United States and Canada
Omoglymmius hamatus (LeConte, 1875) - United States and Canada
Omoglymmius lewisi (Nakane, 1973) - Japan
Subgenus Caeconavitia R.T. & J.R.Bell, 1982
Omoglymmius okei R.T. & J.R.Bell, 1992 - Australia
Omoglymmius zimmermani R.T. & J.R.Bell, 1978 - Fiji
Subgenus Carinoglymmius R.T. & J.R.Bell, 1982
Omoglymmius carinatus (Grouvelle, 1903) - Indonesia and Borneo
Omoglymmius hexagonus (Grouvelle, 1903) - Indonesia and Borneo
Omoglymmius nicobarensis (Grouvelle, 1895) - India
Subgenus Hemiglymmius R.T. & J.R.Bell, 1978
Omoglymmius africanus (Grouvelle, 1892) - Africa
Omoglymmius borneensis (Grouvelle, 1903) - Indonesia and Borneo
Omoglymmius germaini (Grouvelle, 1903) - Indonesia
Omoglymmius hemipunctatus R.T. & J.R.Bell, 1983 - Indonesia
Omoglymmius ineditus (Dajoz, 1975) - Indonesia and Borneo
Omoglymmius inermis R.T. & J.R.Bell, 1983 - Indonesia
Omoglymmius javanicus (Grouvelle, 1903) - India and Indonesia
Omoglymmius occultus R.T. & J.R.Bell, 1983 - Indonesia
Omoglymmius rimatus R.T. & J.R.Bell, 1983 - Indonesia
Subgenus Indoglymmius R.T. & J.R.Bell, 1982
Omoglymmius astraea R.T. & J.R.Bell, 1987 - Indonesia
Omoglymmius lineatus (Grouvelle, 1908) - India
Subgenus Laminoglymmius R.T. & J.R.Bell, 1982
Omoglymmius actae R.T. & J.R.Bell, 1983 - New Guinea
Omoglymmius gorgo R.T. & J.R.Bell, 1983 - Indonesia
Omoglymmius inaequalis R.T. & J.R.Bell, 1983 - India
Omoglymmius insularis (Grouvelle, 1903) - Indonesia
Omoglymmius oberthueri (Grouvelle, 1903) - Malaysia
Omoglymmius perplexus R.T. & J.R.Bell, 1985 - Indonesia
Omoglymmius rugosus (Grouvelle, 1903) - Singapore, Indonesia, and Borneo
Omoglymmius trisinuatus R.T. & J.R.Bell, 1983 - Indonesia
Subgenus Navitia R.T. & J.R.Bell, 1978
Omoglymmius intrusus (Grouvelle, 1903) - Fiji
Omoglymmius peckorum R.T. & J.R.Bell, 1985 - Fiji
Omoglymmius stylatus R.T. & J.R.Bell, 1983 - Vanuatu
Subgenus Nitiglymmius R.T. & J.R.Bell, 1978
Omoglymmius fulgens R.T. & J.R.Bell, 1978 - New Guinea
Omoglymmius greensladei R.T. & J.R.Bell, 1978
Omoglymmius hornabrooki R.T. & J.R.Bell, 1978 - New Guinea
Omoglymmius lustrans R.T. & J.R.Bell, 1978 - New Guinea
Omoglymmius offafinus R.T. & J.R.Bell, 1978 - New Guinea
Omoglymmius semioculatus R.T. & J.R.Bell, 1983 - Philippines
Omoglymmius toxopei R.T. & J.R.Bell, 1978 - New Guinea
Subgenus Omoglymmius Ganglbauer, 1891

Omoglymmius amplus R.T. & J.R.Bell, 1983 - Indonesia
Omoglymmius aristeus R.T. & J.R.Bell, 1989 - New Guinea
Omoglymmius asetatus R.T. & J.R.Bell, 1983 - New Guinea
Omoglymmius auratus R.T. & J.R.Bell, 1983 - New Guinea
Omoglymmius batantae R.T. & J.R.Bell, 2009 - Indonesia and New Guinea
Omoglymmius batchianus (Arrow, 1901) - Indonesia
Omoglymmius bicarinatus R.T. & J.R.Bell, 1983 - Indonesia
Omoglymmius biroi R.T. & J.R.Bell, 1983 - New Guinea
Omoglymmius bituberculatus R.T. & J.R.Bell, 1992 - Australia
Omoglymmius bouchardi R.T. & J.R.Bell, 1983 - Indonesia
Omoglymmius brendelli R.T. & J.R.Bell, 1987 - Indonesia
Omoglymmius bucculatus (Arrow, 1901) - Indonesia
Omoglymmius caelatus R.T. & J.R.Bell, 1981
Omoglymmius capito (Grouvelle, 1895) - New Guinea
Omoglymmius cavea R.T. & J.R.Bell, 1983 - New Guinea
Omoglymmius cheesmanae (Arrow, 1942) - New Guinea
Omoglymmius classicus R.T. & J.R.Bell, 1983
Omoglymmius coelebs R.T. & J.R.Bell, 1983 - Philippines
Omoglymmius consors R.T. & J.R.Bell, 1983 - Indonesia and Borneo
Omoglymmius continuus R.T. & J.R.Bell, 1983 - Indonesia
Omoglymmius crassicornis R.T. & J.R.Bell, 1983 - Philippines
Omoglymmius craticulus R.T. & J.R.Bell, 1985 - New Guinea
Omoglymmius cupedoides R.T. & J.R.Bell, 1993 - New Guinea
Omoglymmius data R.T. & J.R.Bell, 1983 - Philippines
Omoglymmius denticulatus R.T. & J.R.Bell, 1983 - New Guinea
Omoglymmius duplex R.T. & J.R.Bell, 1983 - Philippines
Omoglymmius emdomani R.T. & J.R.Bell, 2000 - New Guinea
Omoglymmius ephemeris R.T. & J.R.Bell, 1983 - New Guinea
Omoglymmius evasus R.T. & J.R.Bell, 1983 - Philippines
Omoglymmius ferrugatus R.T. & J.R.Bell, 1987 - Indonesia
Omoglymmius follis R.T. & J.R.Bell, 1983 - New Guinea
Omoglymmius fraudulentus R.T. & J.R.Bell, 1983 - Indonesia and Borneo
Omoglymmius fringillus R.T. & J.R.Bell, 1983 - New Guinea
Omoglymmius germari (Ganglbauer, 1891) - Palearctic]]
Omoglymmius gracilicornis (Grouvelle, 1895) - New Guinea
Omoglymmius gressitti R.T. & J.R.Bell, 1985 - New Guinea
Omoglymmius gurneyi R.T. & J.R.Bell, 1983 - Solomon Islands
Omoglymmius hiekei R.T. & J.R.Bell, 1983 - Indonesia, Borneo, and Philippines
Omoglymmius horaki Hovorka, 2015 - Indonesia
Omoglymmius humeralis (Grouvelle, 1895) - Indonesia
Omoglymmius ichthyocephalus (Lea, 1904) - New Guinea and Australia
Omoglymmius impletus R.T. & J.R.Bell, 1981
Omoglymmius imugani R.T. & J.R.Bell, 1983 - Philippines
Omoglymmius iridescens R.T. & J.R.Bell, 1983 - New Guinea
Omoglymmius largus R.T. & J.R.Bell, 1985 - New Guinea
Omoglymmius laticeps R.T.Bell, 1977 - Bhutan
Omoglymmius lentus R.T. & J.R.Bell, 1983 - New Guinea
Omoglymmius lindrothi R.T. & J.R.Bell, 1983 - Solomon Islands
Omoglymmius malabaricus (Arrow, 1901) - India
Omoglymmius malaicus (Arrow, 1901) - Malaysia
Omoglymmius manni R.T. & J.R.Bell, 1983 - Solomon Islands
Omoglymmius massa R.T. & J.R.Bell, 1983 - New Guinea
Omoglymmius modicus R.T. & J.R.Bell, 1983 - Solomon Islands
Omoglymmius modiglianii R.T. & J.R.Bell, 1983 - Indonesia
Omoglymmius monteithi R.T. & J.R.Bell, 1992 - Australia
Omoglymmius morditus R.T. & J.R.Bell, 1983 - Indonesia
Omoglymmius mycteroides R.T. & J.R.Bell, 1983 - Solomon Islands
Omoglymmius nasalis R.T. & J.R.Bell, 1983 - Indonesia
Omoglymmius nemoralis R.T. & J.R.Bell, 1983 - Indonesia and Borneo
Omoglymmius oceanicus R.T. & J.R.Bell, 1981
Omoglymmius opticus R.T. & J.R.Bell, 1983 - Indonesia
Omoglymmius oroensis R.T. & J.R.Bell, 1983 - New Guinea
Omoglymmius patens R.T. & J.R.Bell, 1983 - New Guinea
Omoglymmius pectoralis R.T. & J.R.Bell, 1983 - Indonesia
Omoglymmius philippinensis (Chevrolat, 1876) - Philippines
Omoglymmius planiceps R.T. & J.R.Bell, 1983 - New Guinea
Omoglymmius politus R.T. & J.R.Bell, 1983 - Philippines
Omoglymmius princeps R.T. & J.R.Bell, 1983 - Solomon Islands
Omoglymmius priscae Hovorka, 2015 - Indonesia
Omoglymmius pulvinatus (Grouvelle, 1903) - New Guinea
Omoglymmius puncticornis R.T. & J.R.Bell, 1983 - New Guinea
Omoglymmius quadraticollis (Arrow, 1901) - Indonesia
Omoglymmius quadruplex R.T. & J.R.Bell, 1983 - Philippines
Omoglymmius regius R.T. & J.R.Bell, 1983 - Solomon Islands
Omoglymmius renutus R.T. & J.R.Bell, 1983 - Solomon Islands
Omoglymmius repetitus R.T. & J.R.Bell, 1983 - Indonesia
Omoglymmius rusticus R.T. & J.R.Bell, 1983 - Solomon Islands
Omoglymmius sabah R.T. & J.R.Bell, 1993 - Indonesia and Borneo
Omoglymmius sakuraii (Nakane, 1973) - China, Japan, Taiwan, and Vietnam
Omoglymmius scopulinus R.T. & J.R.Bell, 1983 - Solomon Islands
Omoglymmius sectatus R.T. & J.R.Bell, 1983 - New Guinea
Omoglymmius sedlaceki R.T. & J.R.Bell, 1983 - New Guinea
Omoglymmius semperi R.T. & J.R.Bell, 1983 - Philippines
Omoglymmius seriatus R.T. & J.R.Bell, 1987 - Indonesia
Omoglymmius solitarius (Arrow, 1942) - India
Omoglymmius summissus R.T. & J.R.Bell, 1983 - Indonesia
Omoglymmius sus R.T. & J.R.Bell, 1983 - New Guinea
Omoglymmius tabulatus R.T. & J.R.Bell, 1983 - Solomon Islands
Omoglymmius tamblinganensis Hovorka, 2017 - Indonesia
Omoglymmius thoracicus R.T. & J.R.Bell, 1983 - Indonesia
Omoglymmius tolai R.T. & J.R.Bell, 1985
Omoglymmius trepidus R.T. & J.R.Bell, 1983 - New Guinea
Omoglymmius truncatus R.T. & J.R.Bell, 2009 - Thailand
Omoglymmius vadosus R.T. & J.R.Bell, 1983 - Indonesia
Omoglymmius vicinus (Grouvelle, 1895) - New Guinea
Omoglymmius viduus R.T. & J.R.Bell, 1983 - Indonesia
Omoglymmius wallacei R.T. & J.R.Bell, 1987 - Indonesia
Omoglymmius wittmeri R.T. & J.R.Bell, 1983 - Indonesia
Omoglymmius wukong Wang; Ruzicka & Liu, 2017 - China

Subgenus Orthoglymmius R.T. & J.R.Bell, 1978
Omoglymmius alticola (Grouvelle, 1913) - India
Omoglymmius cavifrons (Grouvelle, 1914) - Japan and Taiwan
Omoglymmius coomani (Arrow, 1942) - China, Thailand, Vietnam, and Indonesia
Omoglymmius crenatus (Grouvelle, 1903) - Nepal, Bhutan, India, and Laos
Omoglymmius darjeelingensis Saha; Halder & Biswas, 1995 - India
Omoglymmius feae (Grouvelle, 1895) - Myanmar
Omoglymmius longiceps (Grouvelle, 1910) - Myanmar
Omoglymmius microtis R.T. & J.R.Bell, 1983 - Japan
Omoglymmius sulcicollis (Lewis, 1888) - Japan
Subgenus Pyxiglymmius R.T. & J.R.Bell, 1978
Omoglymmius armatus (Arrow, 1901) - India
Omoglymmius crassiusculus (Lewis, 1888) - Japan
Omoglymmius cristatus R.T. & J.R.Bell, 1983 - Philippines
Omoglymmius cycloderus R.T. & J.R.Bell, 2002 - New Guinea
Omoglymmius hesperus R.T. & J.R.Bell, 1983 - Indonesia
Omoglymmius krikkeni R.T. & J.R.Bell, 1983 - Indonesia
Omoglymmius lederi (Lewis, 1888) - Georgia
Omoglymmius multicarinatus R.T. & J.R.Bell, 1993 - Indonesia
Omoglymmius opacus R.T. & J.R.Bell, 1985 - Indonesia
Omoglymmius pilosus (Grouvelle, 1903) - Indonesia and Borneo
Omoglymmius strabus (Newman, 1838) - Malaysia, Indonesia, and Borneo
Omoglymmius subcaviceps (Grouvelle, 1903) - Vietnam
