= Omoglymmius solitarius =

Scientific classification
- Kingdom: Animalia
- Phylum: Arthropoda
- Class: Insecta
- Order: Coleoptera
- Suborder: Adephaga
- Family: Carabidae
- Genus: Omoglymmius
- Species: O. solitarius

Binomial name
- Omoglymmius solitarius (Arrow, 1942)

Species of beetle

Omoglymmius solitarius is a species of beetle in the subfamily Rhysodidae (wrinkled bark beetles). It was described by Arrow in 1942.
