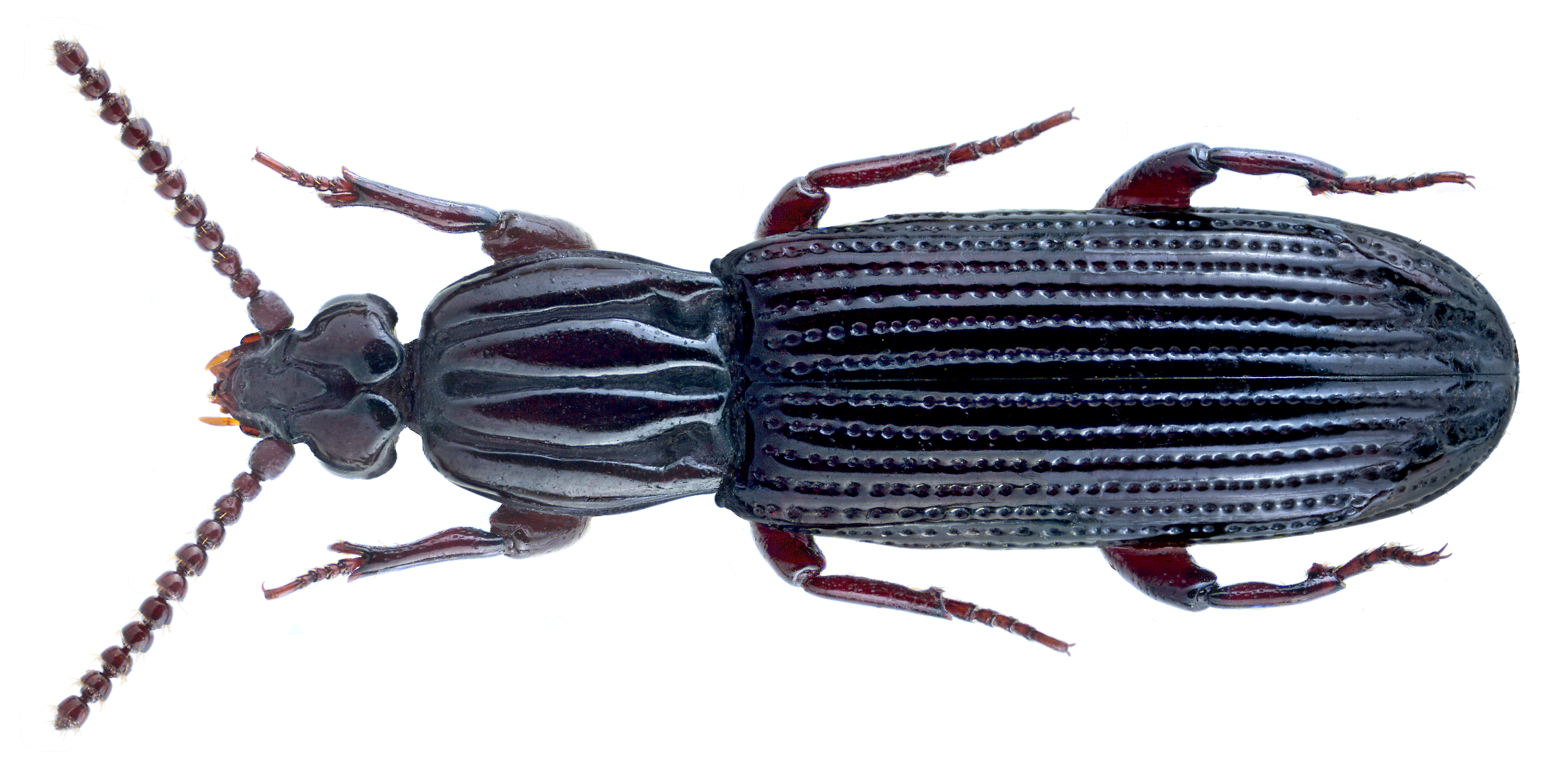

Scientific classification
- Kingdom: Animalia
- Phylum: Arthropoda
- Class: Insecta
- Order: Coleoptera
- Suborder: Adephaga
- Family: Carabidae
- Genus: Omoglymmius
- Species: O. germari

Binomial name
- Omoglymmius germari (Ganglbauer, 1891)

= Omoglymmius germari =

Species of beetle

Omoglymmius germari is a species of beetle in the subfamily Rhysodidae. It was described by Ludwig Ganglbauer in 1891. It is located in Central and South Europe and can be found in deciduous forests, living in old fallen trunks of trees. As they rely on decaying wood at some point in their lifespan, they are saproxylic beetles.

This species is very rare with little documentation, resulting in no protection against extinction.
