= Omoglymmius sulcicollis =

Scientific classification
- Kingdom: Animalia
- Phylum: Arthropoda
- Class: Insecta
- Order: Coleoptera
- Suborder: Adephaga
- Family: Carabidae
- Genus: Omoglymmius
- Species: O. sulcicollis

Binomial name
- Omoglymmius sulcicollis (Lewis, 1888)

Species of beetle

Omoglymmius sulcicollis is a species of beetle in the subfamily Rhysodidae. It was described by Lewis in 1888.
