= Omoglymmius malabaricus =

Scientific classification
- Kingdom: Animalia
- Phylum: Arthropoda
- Class: Insecta
- Order: Coleoptera
- Suborder: Adephaga
- Family: Carabidae
- Genus: Omoglymmius
- Species: O. malabaricus

Binomial name
- Omoglymmius malabaricus (Arrow, 1901)

Species of beetle

Omoglymmius malabaricus is a species of beetle in the subfamily Rhysodidae. It was described by Arrow in 1901.
