= Omoglymmius quadraticollis =

Scientific classification
- Kingdom: Animalia
- Phylum: Arthropoda
- Class: Insecta
- Order: Coleoptera
- Suborder: Adephaga
- Family: Carabidae
- Genus: Omoglymmius
- Species: O. quadraticollis

Binomial name
- Omoglymmius quadraticollis (Arrow, 1901)

Species of beetle

Omoglymmius quadraticollis is a species of beetle in the subfamily Rhysodidae. It was described by Arrow in 1901.
