= Omoglymmius ineditus =

Scientific classification
- Kingdom: Animalia
- Phylum: Arthropoda
- Class: Insecta
- Order: Coleoptera
- Suborder: Adephaga
- Family: Carabidae
- Genus: Omoglymmius
- Species: O. ineditus

Binomial name
- Omoglymmius ineditus (Dajoz, 1975)

Species of beetle

Omoglymmius ineditus is a species of beetle in the subfamily Rhysodidae. It was described by Dajoz in 1975.
