= Omoglymmius ichthyocephalus =

Scientific classification
- Kingdom: Animalia
- Phylum: Arthropoda
- Class: Insecta
- Order: Coleoptera
- Suborder: Adephaga
- Family: Carabidae
- Genus: Omoglymmius
- Species: O. ichthyocephalus

Binomial name
- Omoglymmius ichthyocephalus (Lea, 1904)

Species of beetle

Omoglymmius ichthyocephalus is a species of beetle in the subfamily Rhysodidae. It was described by Lea in 1904.
