= Omoglymmius crassiusculus =

Scientific classification
- Kingdom: Animalia
- Phylum: Arthropoda
- Class: Insecta
- Order: Coleoptera
- Suborder: Adephaga
- Family: Carabidae
- Genus: Omoglymmius
- Species: O. crassiusculus

Binomial name
- Omoglymmius crassiusculus (Lewis, 1888)

Species of beetle

Omoglymmius crassiusculus is a species of beetle in the subfamily Rhysodidae. It was described by Lewis in 1888.
