= Antoine Henri Grouvelle =

French entomologist (1843-1917)

- Born: January 17, 1843; France
- Died: June 9, 1917 (aged 74); Neuilly-sur-Seine, France
- Occupations: Engineer, entomologist
- Known for: Description of numerous Coleoptera species, e.g. Pachyelmis regimbarti
- Scientific career
- Fields: Entomology (Coleoptera, Clavicornia)
- Workplaces: Tobacco factory (director)
- Author abbrev. (zoology): Grouvelle

Antoine Henri Grouvelle (17 January 1843 – 9 June 1917, Neuilly-sur-Seine) was a French entomologist who specialised in Coleoptera. He was also an engineer who directed a tobacco factory.

== Career ==
Grouvelle worked on the world fauna of the heterogeneous group of beetles known as Clavicornia, describing hundreds of new species from material collected during French, Italian and Belgian colonial expeditions across Africa, Asia and the Americas. He was a member of the Société entomologique de France.

== Selected works ==
- Viaggio di Leonardo Fea in Birmania e regioni vicine. L. Nitidulides, Cucujides et Parnides. Annali del Museo Civico di Storia Naturale de Genova, 32: 813–868 (1892)
- Potamophilides, Dryopides, Helmides et Heterocerides des Indes orientales. Annali del Museo Civico di Storia Naturale de Genova, Serie 2, 17(37): 1–25 (1896)
- Nitidulides, Colydiides, Cucujides et Parnides récoltés par M. E. Gounelle au Brésil et autres Clavicornes nouveaux d'Amerique. Annales de la Société Entomologique de France, 65: 177–216 (1896)
- With Achille Raffray, Supplément à la Liste des Coléoptères de la Guadeloupe. Ann. Soc. Entom. France vol. 81 (1912)
- Wissenschaftliche Ergebnisse der schwedischen zoologischen Expedition nach dem Kilimandjaro, dem Meru und dem umgebenden Massaisteppen. Coleoptera. Clavicornes. (1909)
- Études sur les Coléoptères (premier & deuxième fascicule) (1916–1918)

== Selected works ==
- Viaggio di Leonardo Fea in Birmania e regioni vicine. L. Nitidulides, Cucujides et Parnides. Annali del Museo Civico di Storia Naturale de Genova, 32: 813–868.(1892)
- Potamophilides, Dryopides, Helmides et Heterocerides des Indes orientales. Annali del Museo Civico di Storia Naturale de Genova, Serie 2, 17(37): 1-25.(1896)
- Nitidulides, Colydiides, Cucujides et Parnides récoltés par M. E. Gounelle au Brésil et autres Clavicornes nouveaux d' Amerique. Annales de la Société Entomologique de France, 65: 177–216.(1896)
- with Achille Raffray Supplément à la Liste des Coléoptères de la Guadeloupe Ann. Soc. Entom. France vol. 81 (1912)
- Wissenschaftliche Ergebnisse der schwedischen zoologischen Expedition nach dem Kilimandjaro, dem Meru und dem umgebenden Massaisteppen. Coleoptera. Clavicornes.(1909)
- Études sur les Coléoptères (premier & deuxième fascicule)(various works on "Clavicornes" bound together) (1916–1918).
