= Joyce Bell =

American nursing teacher and entomologist

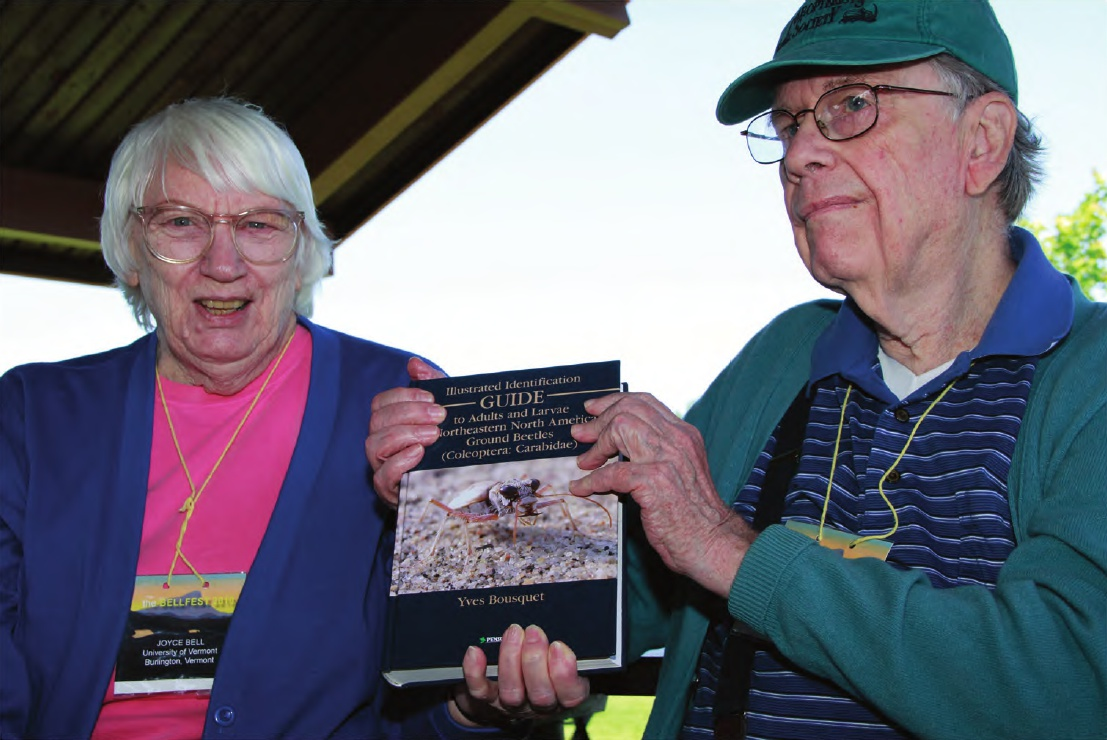
Bell (left) with her husband Ross in 2010

Joyce Elaine Rockenbach Bell (born c. 1927) is an American nursing teacher and entomologist. She worked on insect taxonomy at the University of Vermont, together with her husband Ross Bell (1929–2019). The pair described more than 75% of the rhysodine species known to science.

== Life ==
Joyce Elaine Rockenbach grew up in Whitestone, Queens, New York City. Her grandfather apparently told her that "a woman can teach or be a nurse". She gained a B.S. at Queens College and spent eight years as a research assistant at the Columbia College of Physicians and Surgeons before coming to the University of Vermont to do a Master's. She taught in the UVM School of Nursing for ten years.

In 1957 Joyce Rochenbach married the University of Vermont entomologist Ross Bell. They increasingly collaborated on entomological taxonomy, with Joyce specializing in microscopy and illustration. In the 1960s the pair began an active program to document the arthropod fauna of Vermont. Their work built the UVM Entomological Collection into a significant resource for Northern New England. In the 1970s and 1980s, Ross and Joyce extended the boundaries for their entomological work beyond Vermont, stretching as far as New Zealand and Papua New Guinea.

The pair continued to study entomology after retiring from the University of Vermont. In 2019 Ross Bell died in Shelburne, Vermont.

== Recognition ==
An issue of ZooKeys was published as a Festschrift for Ross and Joyce Bell, following a meeting of coleopterists held in celebration of their work and of Ross's 80th birthday.

The Coleopterists Society offers an annual Ross Taylor Bell and Joyce Rockenbach Bell Research Grant for "an outstanding proposal for beetle research whose work would otherwise not be funded", favouring taxonomy or systematics.

== See also ==
- Ross Bell (where some of their joint publications are listed)
