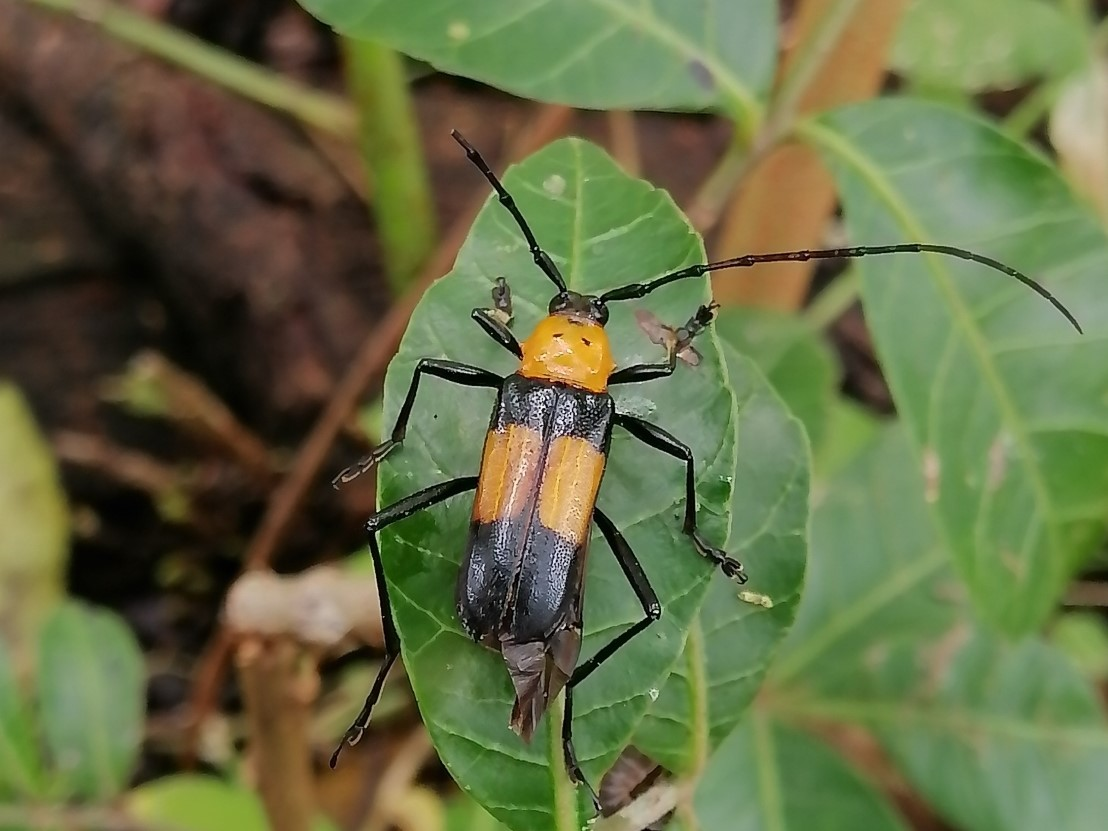

Scientific classification
- Kingdom: Animalia
- Phylum: Arthropoda
- Class: Insecta
- Order: Coleoptera
- Suborder: Polyphaga
- Infraorder: Cucujiformia
- Family: Cerambycidae
- Genus: Gambria
- Species: G. bicolor

Binomial name
- Gambria bicolor (Chevrolat, 1862)

= Gambria bicolor =

Species of beetle

Gambria bicolor is a species of beetle in the family Cerambycidae. It was first described by Louis Alexandre Auguste Chevrolat in 1862.
