= Atelodesmis =

Scientific classification
- Domain: Eukaryota
- Kingdom: Animalia
- Phylum: Arthropoda
- Class: Insecta
- Order: Coleoptera
- Suborder: Polyphaga
- Infraorder: Cucujiformia
- Family: Cerambycidae
- Tribe: Desmiphorini
- Genus: Atelodesmis; Chevrolat, 1841

Genus of beetles

Atelodesmis is a genus of longhorn beetles of the subfamily Lamiinae.

== Species ==
Atelodesmis contains the following species:

- Atelodesmis knabi (Fisher, 1925)
- Atelodesmis mannerheimii Duponchel & Chevrolat, 1841
