= Donald Chandler =

Donald Chandler may refer to:

- Don Chandler (1934–2011), American football player
- Donald S. Chandler, entomologist
