= Clinidium humeridens =

Scientific classification
- Kingdom: Animalia
- Phylum: Arthropoda
- Clade: Pancrustacea
- Class: Insecta
- Order: Coleoptera
- Suborder: Adephaga
- Family: Carabidae
- Genus: Clinidium
- Species: C. humeridens

Binomial name
- Clinidium humeridens Chevrolat, 1873

Species of beetle

Clinidium humeridens is a species of ground beetle in the subfamily Rhysodinae. It was described by Louis Alexandre Auguste Chevrolat in 1873.
