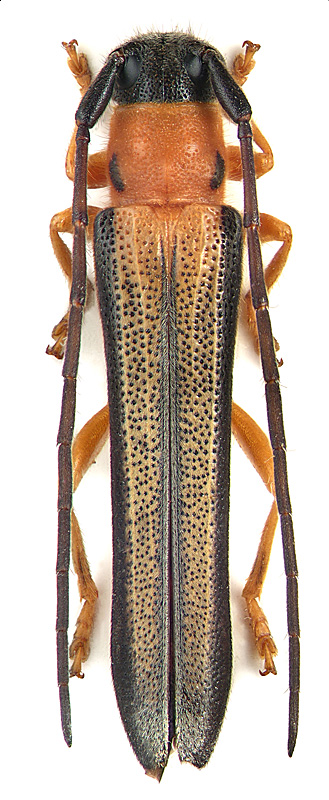

Scientific classification
- Domain: Eukaryota
- Kingdom: Animalia
- Phylum: Arthropoda
- Class: Insecta
- Order: Coleoptera
- Suborder: Polyphaga
- Infraorder: Cucujiformia
- Family: Cerambycidae
- Genus: Oberea
- Species: O. pedemontana

Binomial name
- Oberea pedemontana Chevrolat, 1856

= Oberea pedemontana =

Species of beetle

Oberea pedemontana is a species of beetle in the family Cerambycidae. It was described by Louis Alexandre Auguste Chevrolat in 1856. It has a wide distribution in Europe. It feeds on Rhamnus alpina and Frangula alnus.

== Subspecies ==
- Oberea pedemontana pedemontana Chevrolat, 1856
- Oberea pedemontana koniensis Breuning, 1960
