= Ischnolea bimaculata =

Scientific classification
- Domain: Eukaryota
- Kingdom: Animalia
- Phylum: Arthropoda
- Class: Insecta
- Order: Coleoptera
- Suborder: Polyphaga
- Infraorder: Cucujiformia
- Family: Cerambycidae
- Genus: Ischnolea
- Species: I. bimaculata

Binomial name
- Ischnolea bimaculata Chevrolat, 1861

Species of beetle

Ischnolea bimaculata is a species of beetle in the family Cerambycidae. It was described by Louis Alexandre Auguste Chevrolat in 1861. It is known from Argentina, Brazil, and Paraguay.
