= Clinidium planum =

Scientific classification
- Kingdom: Animalia
- Phylum: Arthropoda
- Clade: Pancrustacea
- Class: Insecta
- Order: Coleoptera
- Suborder: Adephaga
- Family: Carabidae
- Genus: Clinidium
- Species: C. planum

Binomial name
- Clinidium planum (Chevrolat, 1844)

Synonyms
- Rhysodes planus Chevrolat, 1844

Species of beetle

Clinidium planum is a species of ground beetle in the subfamily Rhysodinae. It was described by Louis Alexandre Auguste Chevrolat in 1844. It is probably endemic to Guadeloupe (Lesser Antilles); a female supposedly from "Mexico" probably represents another species and may have been mislabeled. Clinidium planum measure 5.3–6.3 mm (0.21–0.25 in) in length.
