= Dadoychus flavocinctus =

Scientific classification
- Kingdom: Animalia
- Phylum: Arthropoda
- Class: Insecta
- Order: Coleoptera
- Suborder: Polyphaga
- Infraorder: Cucujiformia
- Family: Cerambycidae
- Genus: Dadoychus
- Species: D. flavocinctus

Binomial name
- Dadoychus flavocinctus Chevrolat, 1833

Synonyms
- Dadoychus flavo-cinctus Chevrolat, 1833; Hemilophus flavocinctus (Chevrolat) Gemminger & Harold, 1873

Species of beetle

Dadoychus flavocinctus is a species of beetle in the family Cerambycidae. It was described by Louis Alexandre Auguste Chevrolat in 1833. It is known from Brazil.
