= Glenea carneipes =

Scientific classification
- Domain: Eukaryota
- Kingdom: Animalia
- Phylum: Arthropoda
- Class: Insecta
- Order: Coleoptera
- Suborder: Polyphaga
- Infraorder: Cucujiformia
- Family: Cerambycidae
- Genus: Glenea
- Species: G. carneipes

Binomial name
- Glenea carneipes Chevrolat, 1855

Species of beetle

Glenea carneipes is a species of beetle in the family Cerambycidae. It was described by Louis Alexandre Auguste Chevrolat in 1855. It is known from Nigeria and the Democratic Republic of the Congo.

== Varietas ==
- Glenea carneipes var. postquadrimaculata Breuning, 1958
- Glenea carneipes var. sexvittata Hintz, 1911
