= Clinidium curvicosta =

Scientific classification
- Kingdom: Animalia
- Phylum: Arthropoda
- Clade: Pancrustacea
- Class: Insecta
- Order: Coleoptera
- Suborder: Adephaga
- Family: Carabidae
- Genus: Clinidium
- Species: C. curvicosta

Binomial name
- Clinidium curvicosta Chevrolat, 1873

Species of beetle

Clinidium curvicosta is a species of ground beetle in the subfamily Rhysodinae. It was described by Louis Alexandre Auguste Chevrolat in 1873. It is endemic to the Sierra Maestra in Cuba.

Clinidium curvicosta measure 4.3–6.2 mm (0.17–0.24 in) in length.
