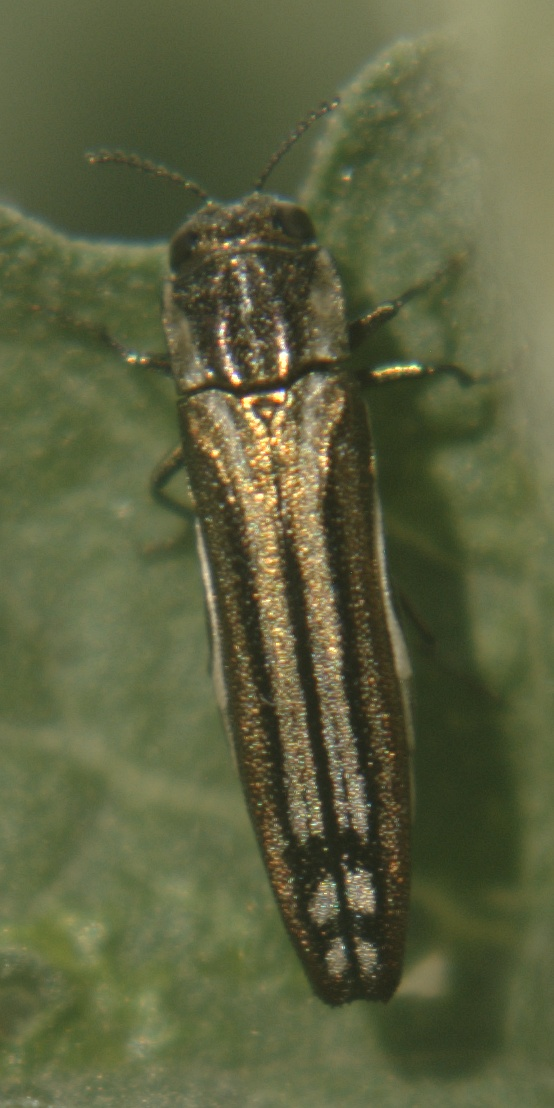

Scientific classification
- Domain: Eukaryota
- Kingdom: Animalia
- Phylum: Arthropoda
- Class: Insecta
- Order: Coleoptera
- Suborder: Polyphaga
- Infraorder: Elateriformia
- Family: Buprestidae
- Genus: Agrilus
- Species: A. aureus

Binomial name
- Agrilus aureus Chevrolat, 1838

Synonyms
- Agrilus couesii LeConte, 1866

= Agrilus aureus =

Species of beetle

Agrilus aureus is a species of metallic wood-boring beetle in the family Buprestidae. It is found in Central America and North America.
