= Clinidium granatense =

Scientific classification
- Kingdom: Animalia
- Phylum: Arthropoda
- Clade: Pancrustacea
- Class: Insecta
- Order: Coleoptera
- Suborder: Adephaga
- Family: Carabidae
- Genus: Clinidium
- Species: C. granatense

Binomial name
- Clinidium granatense Chevrolat, 1873

Species of beetle

Clinidium granatense is a species of ground beetle in the subfamily Rhysodinae. It was described by Louis Alexandre Auguste Chevrolat in 1873. It is known from Colombia (Medellín, Bogotá, and Boyacá).

Clinidium granatense measure 5.3–6.8 mm (0.21–0.27 in) in length.
