= Discoderes =

Scientific classification
- Kingdom: Animalia
- Phylum: Arthropoda
- Class: Insecta
- Order: Coleoptera
- Suborder: Polyphaga
- Infraorder: Elateriformia
- Family: Buprestidae
- Genus: Discoderes; Chevrolat, 1838

Genus of beetles

Discoderes is a genus of beetles in the family Buprestidae, containing the following species:

- Discoderes salzmanni (Solier, 1833)
- Discoderes villiersi Descarpentries, 1952
