= Centrocerum elegans =

Scientific classification
- Kingdom: Animalia
- Phylum: Arthropoda
- Class: Insecta
- Order: Coleoptera
- Suborder: Polyphaga
- Infraorder: Cucujiformia
- Family: Cerambycidae
- Genus: Centrocerum
- Species: C. elegans

Binomial name
- Centrocerum elegans Chevrolat, 1861

Synonyms
- Centrocerum elegans (Chevrolat, 1861) Martins, 2005; Centrocerum elegans Thomson, 1864; Elaphidion elegans (Chevrolat, 1861); Elaphidion elegans hirsutum (Chevrolat, 1861); Elaphidion elegans jocosum (Chevrolat, 1861); Elaphidion elegans puberulum (Chevrolat, 1861); Elaphidion elegans var. hirsutum (Blackwelder, 1946); Elaphidion elegans var. jocosum (Buck, 1959); Elaphidion elegans var. puberulum (Blackwelder, 1946); Hypermallus elegans (Bruch, 1912); Hypermallus elegans hirsutus (Gemminger & Harold, 1872); Hypermallus elegans jocosus (Gemminger & Harold, 1872); Hypermallus elegans puberulus (Gemminger & Harold, 1872); Hypermallus elegans var. hirsutus (Gemminger & Harold, 1872); Hypermallus elegans var. jocosus (Gemminger & Harold, 1872); Hypermallus elegans var. puberulus (Gemminger & Harold, 1872)

Species of beetle

Centrocerum elegans is a species of longhorn beetle (insects in the family Cerambycidae). It was described by Chevrolat in 1861. The species has a South American distribution and is found in Brazil, Bolivia, Paraguay and Argentina.
