= Falsischnolea pallidipennis =

Scientific classification
- Domain: Eukaryota
- Kingdom: Animalia
- Phylum: Arthropoda
- Class: Insecta
- Order: Coleoptera
- Suborder: Polyphaga
- Infraorder: Cucujiformia
- Family: Cerambycidae
- Genus: Falsischnolea
- Species: F. pallidipennis

Binomial name
- Falsischnolea pallidipennis (Chevrolat, 1861)

Species of beetle

Falsischnolea pallidipennis is a species of beetle in the family Cerambycidae. It was described by Louis Alexandre Auguste Chevrolat in 1861.
