= Agrilus taeniatus =

Scientific classification
- Kingdom: Animalia
- Phylum: Arthropoda
- Clade: Pancrustacea
- Class: Insecta
- Order: Coleoptera
- Suborder: Polyphaga
- Infraorder: Elateriformia
- Family: Buprestidae
- Genus: Agrilus
- Species: A. taeniatus

Binomial name
- Agrilus taeniatus Chevrolat, 1835

Synonyms
- Agrilus sapindicola Vogt, 1949

Species of beetle

Agrilus taeniatus is a species of metallic wood-boring beetle in the family Buprestidae. It is found in Central America and North America.
