= Clinidium cavicolle =

Scientific classification
- Kingdom: Animalia
- Phylum: Arthropoda
- Clade: Pancrustacea
- Class: Insecta
- Order: Coleoptera
- Suborder: Adephaga
- Family: Carabidae
- Genus: Clinidium
- Species: C. cavicolle

Binomial name
- Clinidium cavicolle Chevrolat, 1873

Species of beetle

Clinidium cavicolle is a species of ground beetle in the subfamily Rhysodinae. It was described by Louis Alexandre Auguste Chevrolat in 1873. It is known from Colombia; there is an uncertain record from Brazil too. There is uncertainty as regards the origin of the type specimen(s) as the original label refers to "Nova-Grenata, Bogoto", probably referring to Bogotá. What is now designated as the lectotype is from Ocaña, Norte de Santander. The other syntype, probably of "the other sex", matches Chevrolat's description less well and was described in 1985 as Clinidium humile.

Clinidium cavicolle measure 6–7 mm (0.24–0.28 in) in length.
