= Glenea flavicapilla =

Scientific classification
- Domain: Eukaryota
- Kingdom: Animalia
- Phylum: Arthropoda
- Class: Insecta
- Order: Coleoptera
- Suborder: Polyphaga
- Infraorder: Cucujiformia
- Family: Cerambycidae
- Genus: Glenea
- Species: G. flavicapilla

Binomial name
- Glenea flavicapilla (Chevrolat, 1858)

Synonyms
- Sphenura flavicapilla Chevrolat, 1858

Species of beetle

Glenea flavicapilla is a species of beetle in the family Cerambycidae. It was described by Louis Alexandre Auguste Chevrolat in 1858. It is known from Gabon, the Ivory Coast, Cameroon, Ghana, and Kenya.
