= Glenea puella =

Scientific classification
- Domain: Eukaryota
- Kingdom: Animalia
- Phylum: Arthropoda
- Class: Insecta
- Order: Coleoptera
- Suborder: Polyphaga
- Infraorder: Cucujiformia
- Family: Cerambycidae
- Genus: Glenea
- Species: G. puella

Binomial name
- Glenea puella Chevrolat, 1858

Species of beetle

Glenea puella is a species of beetle in the family Cerambycidae. It was described by Louis Alexandre Auguste Chevrolat in 1858.

== Subspecies ==
- Glenea puella assimilis Jordan, 1894
- Glenea puella puella Chevrolat, 1858
