= Glenea quinquelineata =

Scientific classification
- Domain: Eukaryota
- Kingdom: Animalia
- Phylum: Arthropoda
- Class: Insecta
- Order: Coleoptera
- Suborder: Polyphaga
- Infraorder: Cucujiformia
- Family: Cerambycidae
- Genus: Glenea
- Species: G. quinquelineata

Binomial name
- Glenea quinquelineata Chevrolat, 1855

Species of beetle

Glenea quinquelineata is a species of beetle in the family Cerambycidae. It was described by Louis Alexandre Auguste Chevrolat in 1855. It is known from Equatorial Guinea, Cameroon, the Democratic Republic of the Congo, the Ivory Coast, Uganda, Angola, and Nigeria.

== Subspecies ==
- Glenea quinquelineata angolensis Breuning, 1978
- Glenea quinquelineata quinquelineata Chevrolat, 1855
