= Clinidium mexicanum =

Scientific classification
- Kingdom: Animalia
- Phylum: Arthropoda
- Clade: Pancrustacea
- Class: Insecta
- Order: Coleoptera
- Suborder: Adephaga
- Family: Carabidae
- Genus: Clinidium
- Species: C. mexicanum

Binomial name
- Clinidium mexicanum Chevrolat, 1873

Species of beetle

Clinidium mexicanum is a species of ground beetle in the subfamily Rhysodinae. It was described by Louis Alexandre Auguste Chevrolat in 1873. It is endemic to the southern part of the Mexican Plateau. Clinidium mexicanum measure 6–8.5 mm (0.24–0.33 in) in length.
