= Clinidium humile =

Scientific classification
- Kingdom: Animalia
- Phylum: Arthropoda
- Clade: Pancrustacea
- Class: Insecta
- Order: Coleoptera
- Suborder: Adephaga
- Family: Carabidae
- Genus: Clinidium
- Species: C. humile

Binomial name
- Clinidium humile R.T. Bell & J.R. Bell, 1985

Species of beetle

Clinidium humile is a species of ground beetle in the subfamily Rhysodinae. It was described by R.T. Bell & J.R. Bell in 1985. It is known from "New Granada", which could be in either present-day Colombia or Panama. What now is the holotype of Clinidium humile was originally identified by Louis Alexandre Auguste Chevrolat as Clinidium cavicolle of "the other sex". The holotype is a male measuring 6.8 mm (0.27 in) in length.
