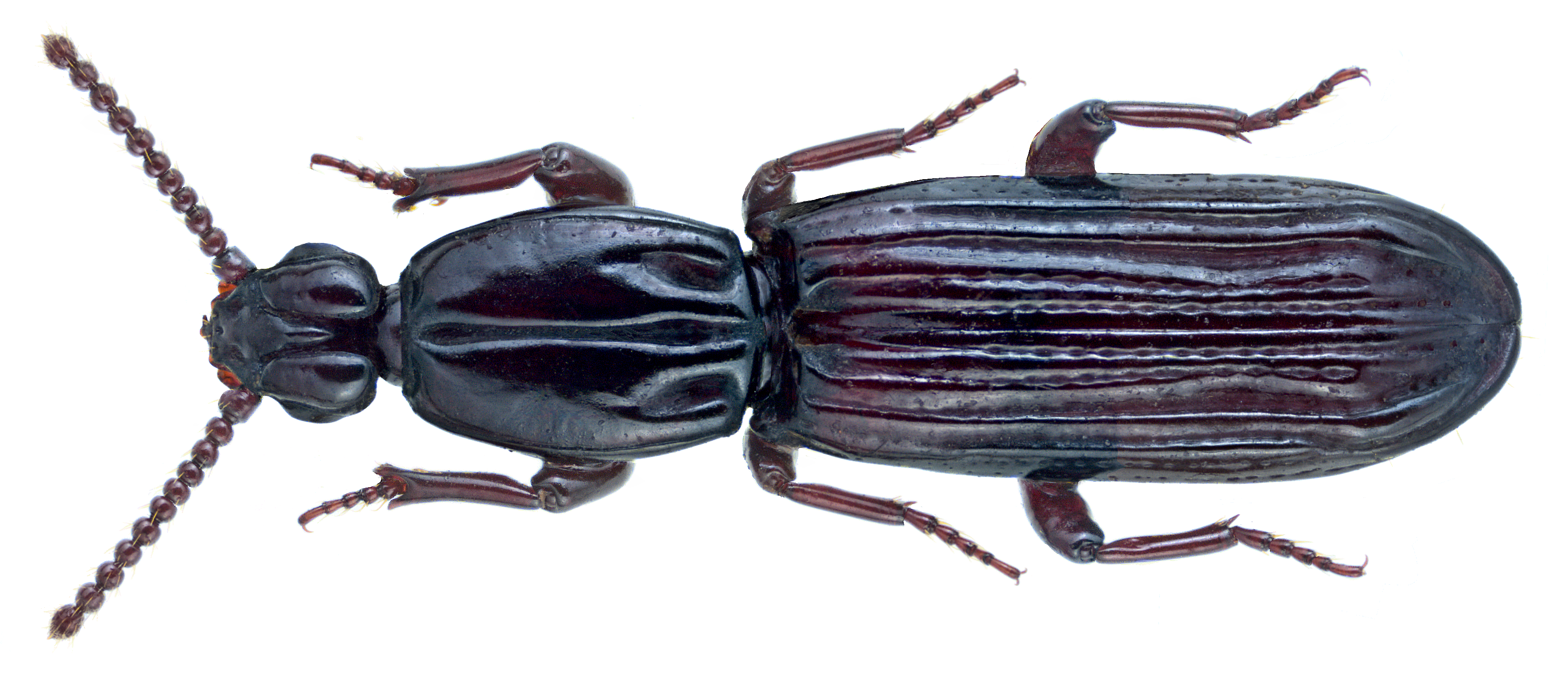
- Clinidium marginicolle

Scientific classification
- Kingdom: Animalia
- Phylum: Arthropoda
- Clade: Pancrustacea
- Class: Insecta
- Order: Coleoptera
- Suborder: Adephaga
- Family: Carabidae
- Subfamily: Rhysodinae
- Genus: Clinidium; Kirby, 1835

= Clinidium =

Clinidium Temporal range: probably Miocene–present

Genus of beetles

Clinidium is a genus of wrinkled bark beetles in the subfamily Rhysodinae. Most species are Neotropical, but some occur further north in North America and there is also one species in Europe (Clinidium canaliculatum) and one in Japan. Two species are known from Miocene amber.

There are five subgenera:

- Clinidium (Mexiclinidium)
- Clinidium (Protainoa)
- Clinidium (Tainoa)
- Clinidium (Arctoclinidium)
- Clinidium (Clinidium)

== Species ==
The genus contains the following species:

- Clinidium alleni R.T. Bell & J.R. Bell, 1985
- Clinidium apertum Reitter, 1880
- Clinidium argus R.T. Bell & J.R. Bell, 1985
- Clinidium ashei R.T. Bell & J.R. Bell, 2009
- Clinidium baitense R.T. Bell, 1970
- Clinidium baldufi R. T. Bell, 1970
- Clinidium balli R.T. Bell & J.R. Bell, 1985
- Clinidium beccarii Grouvelle, 1903
- Clinidium bechyneorum R.T. Bell & J.R. Bell, 1985
- Clinidium blomi R.T. Bell, 1970
- Clinidium boroquense R.T. Bell, 1970
- Clinidium brusteli R.T. Bell & J.R. Bell, 2009
- Clinidium calcaratum LeConte, 1875
- Clinidium canaliculatum O.G. Costa, 1839
- Clinidium cavicolle Chevrolat, 1873
- Clinidium centrale Grouvelle, 1903
- Clinidium championi R.T. Bell & J.R. Bell, 1985
- Clinidium chandleri R.T. Bell & J.R. Bell, 2009
- Clinidium chevrolati Reitter, 1880
- Clinidium chiolinoi R.T. Bell, 1970
- Clinidium cizeki Hovorka, 2019
- Clinidium corbis R.T. Bell, 1970
- Clinidium crater R.T. Bell & J.R. Bell, 1985
- Clinidium curvatum R.T. Bell & J.R. Bell, 1985
- Clinidium curvicosta Chevrolat, 1873
- Clinidium darlingtoni R.T. Bell, 1970
- Clinidium dormans R.T. Bell & J.R. Bell, 1985
- Clinidium dubium Grouvelle, 1903
- Clinidium dux R.T. Bell & J.R. Bell, 2009
- Clinidium erwini R.T. Bell & J.R. Bell, 2009
- Clinidium excavatum R.T. Bell & J.R. Bell, 1985
- Clinidium extrarium R.T. Bell & J.R. Bell, 1978
- Clinidium felix R.T. Bell & J.R. Bell, 2009
- Clinidium foveolatum Grouvelle, 1903
- Clinidium gilloglyi R.T. Bell & J.R. Bell, 2000
- Clinidium granatense Chevrolat, 1873
- †Clinidium grimaldii R.T. Bell & J.R. Bell, 2009
- Clinidium guatemalenum Sharp, 1899
- Clinidium guildingii Kirby, 1830
- Clinidium haitiense R.T. Bell, 1970
- Clinidium halffteri R.T. Bell & J.R. Bell, 1985
- Clinidium hammondi R.T. Bell & J.R. Bell, 1985
- Clinidium howdenorum R.T. Bell & J.R. Bell, 1985
- Clinidium humboldti R.T. Bell & J.R. Bell, 1985
- Clinidium humeridens Chevrolat, 1873
- Clinidium humile R.T. Bell & J.R. Bell, 1985
- Clinidium impressum R.T. Bell & J.R. Bell, 1985
- Clinidium incis R.T. Bell, 1970
- Clinidium insigne Grouvelle, 1903
- Clinidium integrum Grouvelle, 1903
- Clinidium iviei R.T. Bell & J.R. Bell, 1985
- Clinidium jamaicense Arrow, 1942
- Clinidium jolyi R.T. Bell & J.R. Bell, 1985
- Clinidium kochalkai R.T. Bell & J.R. Bell, 1985
- Clinidium mareki Hovorka, 1997
- Clinidium marginicolle Reitter, 1889
- Clinidium mathani Grouvelle, 1903
- Clinidium mexicanum Chevrolat, 1873
- Clinidium microfossatum R.T. Bell & J.R. Bell, 1985
- Clinidium moldenkei R.T. Bell & J.R. Bell, 1985
- Clinidium newtoni R.T. Bell & J.R. Bell, 1985
- Clinidium oberthueri Grouvelle, 1903
- Clinidium onorei R.T. Bell & J.R. Bell, 2000
- Clinidium pala R.T. Bell & J.R. Bell, 1985
- Clinidium penicillatum R.T. Bell & J.R. Bell, 1985
- Clinidium pilosum Grouvelle, 1903
- Clinidium planum Chevrolat, 1844
- †Clinidium poinari R.T. Bell & J.R. Bell, 2009
- Clinidium reyesi R.T. Bell & J.R. Bell, 1987
- Clinidium rojasi Chevrolat, 1873
- Clinidium rosenbergi R.T. Bell, 1970
- Clinidium rossi R.T. Bell, 1970
- Clinidium sculptile (E. Newman, 1838)
- Clinidium segne R.T. Bell & J.R. Bell, 1985
- Clinidium simplex Chevrolat, 1873
- Clinidium smithsonianum R.T. Bell & J.R. Bell, 1985
- Clinidium spatulatum R.T. Bell & J.R. Bell, 1985
- Clinidium sulcigaster R.T. Bell, 1970
- Clinidium talamanca R.T. Bell & J.R. Bell, 2009
- Clinidium trionyx R.T. Bell & J.R. Bell, 1985
- Clinidium triplehorni R.T. Bell & J.R. Bell, 1985
- Clinidium valentinei R.T. Bell, 1970
- Clinidium validum Grouvelle, 1903
- Clinidium veneficum Lewis, 1888
- Clinidium whiteheadi R.T. Bell & J.R. Bell, 1985
- Clinidium xenopodium R.T. Bell, 1970
