= Oberea trilineata =

Scientific classification
- Domain: Eukaryota
- Kingdom: Animalia
- Phylum: Arthropoda
- Class: Insecta
- Order: Coleoptera
- Suborder: Polyphaga
- Infraorder: Cucujiformia
- Family: Cerambycidae
- Genus: Oberea
- Species: O. trilineata

Binomial name
- Oberea trilineata Chevrolat, 1858

Synonyms
- Oberea trilineata m. nigromaculiventris Breuning, 1965; Nitocris kolbei Hintz, 1919

Species of beetle

Oberea trilineata is a species of beetle in the family Cerambycidae. It was described by Louis Alexandre Auguste Chevrolat in 1858. It contains the varietas Oberea trilineata var. nigrosternalis.
