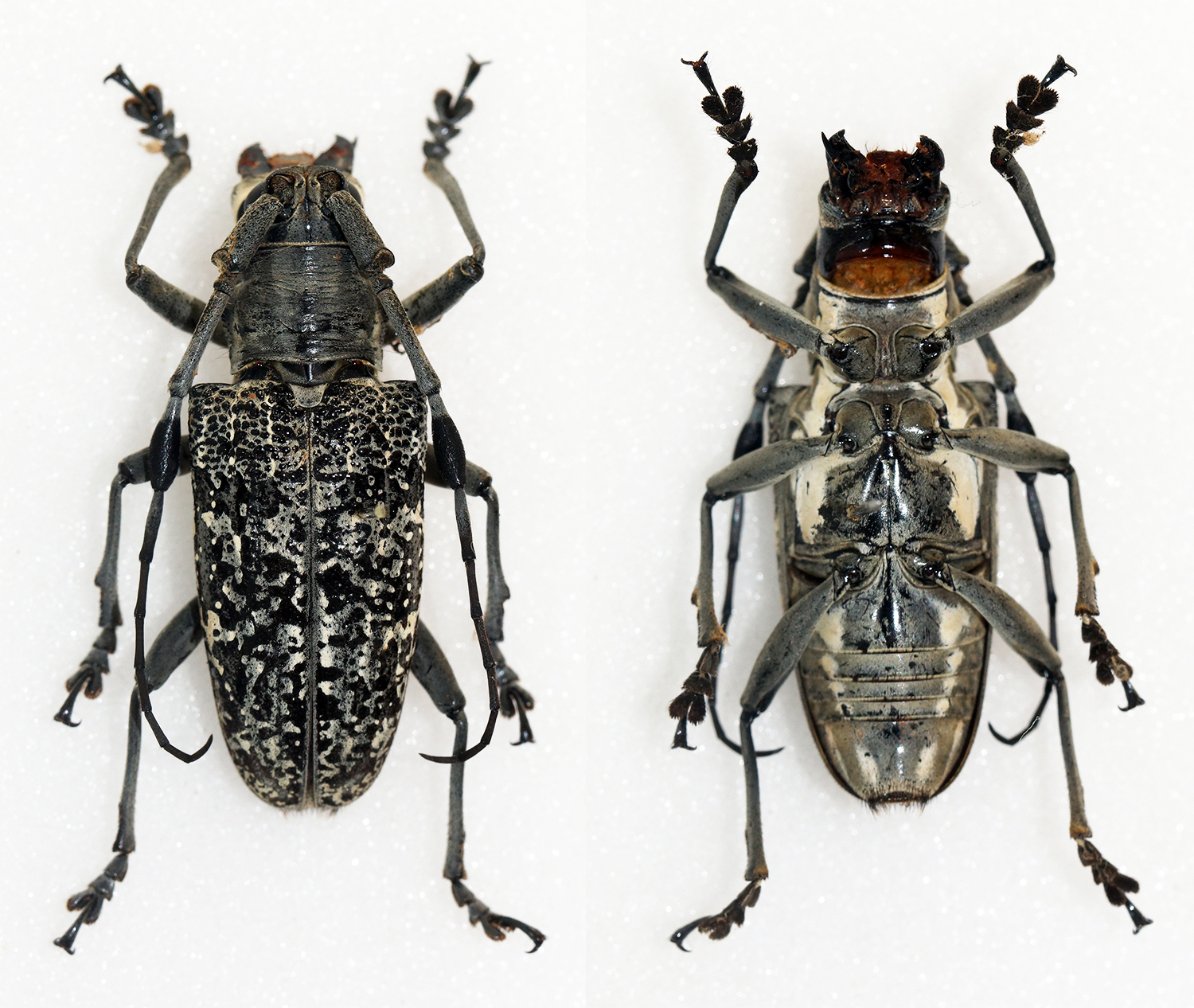
- Triammatus saundersi (female)

Scientific classification
- Kingdom: Animalia
- Phylum: Arthropoda
- Class: Insecta
- Order: Coleoptera
- Suborder: Polyphaga
- Infraorder: Cucujiformia
- Family: Cerambycidae
- Genus: Triammatus
- Species: T. saundersii

Binomial name
- Triammatus saundersii Chevrolat, 1856

Synonyms
- Triammatus saundersi (Chevrolat) Aurivillius, 1921

= Triammatus saundersii =

Species of beetle

Triammatus saundersii is a species of beetle in the family Cerambycidae. It was described by Louis Alexandre Auguste Chevrolat in 1856. It is known from Borneo.
