= Clinidium rojasi =

Scientific classification
- Kingdom: Animalia
- Phylum: Arthropoda
- Clade: Pancrustacea
- Class: Insecta
- Order: Coleoptera
- Suborder: Adephaga
- Family: Carabidae
- Genus: Clinidium
- Species: C. rojasi

Binomial name
- Clinidium rojasi Chevrolat, 1873

Species of beetle

Clinidium rojasi is a species of ground beetle in the subfamily Rhysodinae. It was described by Louis Alexandre Auguste Chevrolat in 1873. It is known from the mountains of northern Venezuela between Falcón and Aragua states and from Guyana.

Clinidium rojasi measure 4.7–5.9 mm (0.19–0.23 in) in length.
