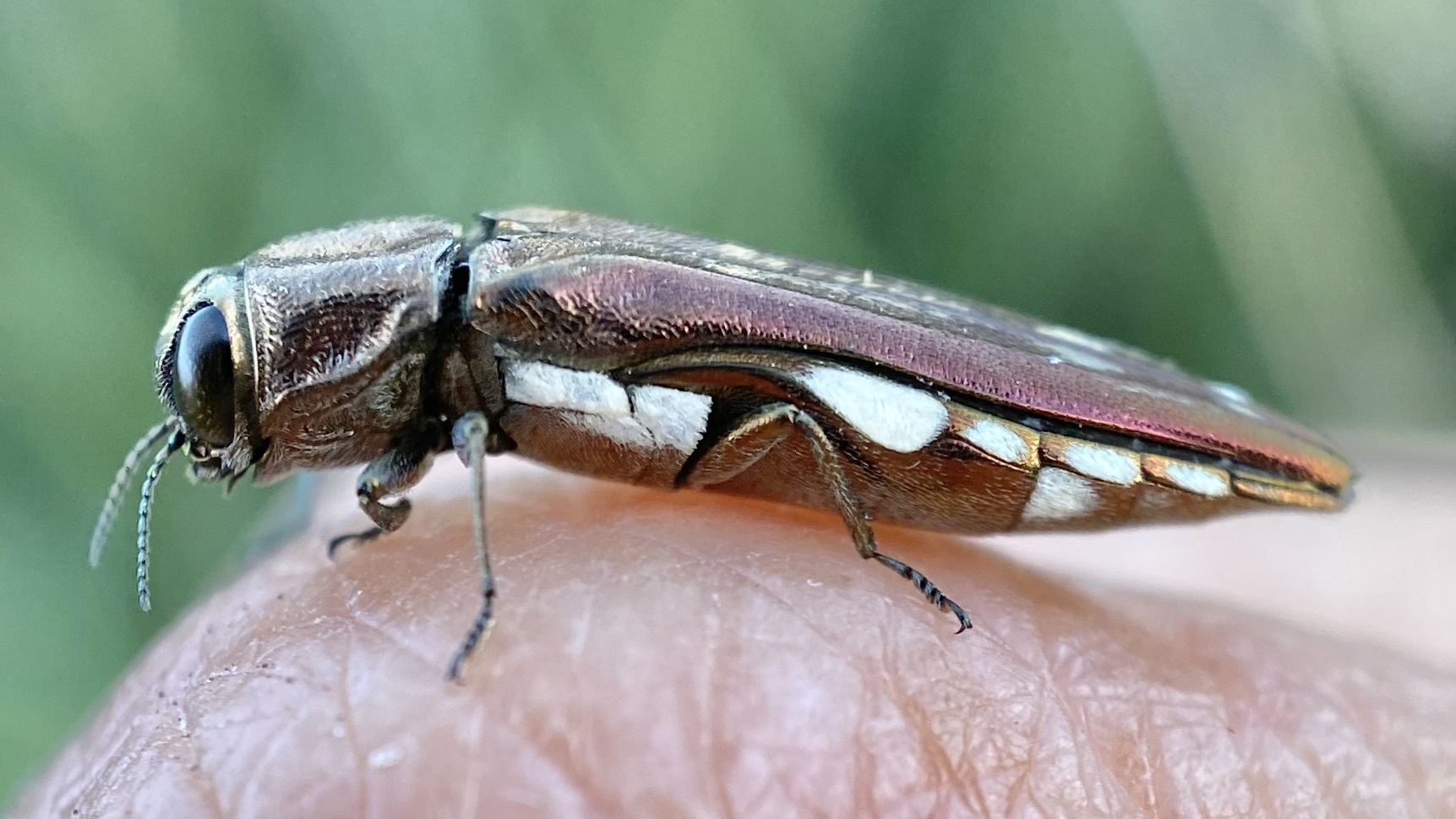

Scientific classification
- Kingdom: Animalia
- Phylum: Arthropoda
- Clade: Pancrustacea
- Class: Insecta
- Order: Coleoptera
- Suborder: Polyphaga
- Infraorder: Elateriformia
- Family: Buprestidae
- Genus: Agrilus
- Species: A. cavatus

Binomial name
- Agrilus cavatus Chevrolat, 1838

Synonyms
- Agrilus texanus Crotch, 1873

= Agrilus cavatus =

Species of beetle

Agrilus cavatus is a species of metallic wood-boring beetle in the family Buprestidae. It is found in Central America, North America, and South America.
