= Clinidium bechyneorum =

Scientific classification
- Kingdom: Animalia
- Phylum: Arthropoda
- Clade: Pancrustacea
- Class: Insecta
- Order: Coleoptera
- Suborder: Adephaga
- Family: Carabidae
- Genus: Clinidium
- Species: C. bechyneorum

Binomial name
- Clinidium bechyneorum R.T. Bell & J.R. Bell, 1985

Species of beetle

Clinidium bechyneorum is a species of ground beetle in the subfamily Rhysodinae. It was described by R.T. Bell & J.R. Bell in 1985. It is known from its type locality in Carabobo, northern Venezuela. An additional specimen that might represent a distinct species is from the neighboring Aragua state. The species is named for J. Bechyne and B. Bechyne, collectors of the type series and many other Clinidium specimens.

Clinidium bechyneorum measure 5.5–6 mm (0.22–0.24 in) in length.
