= Clinidium mareki =

Scientific classification
- Kingdom: Animalia
- Phylum: Arthropoda
- Clade: Pancrustacea
- Class: Insecta
- Order: Coleoptera
- Suborder: Adephaga
- Family: Carabidae
- Genus: Clinidium
- Species: C. mareki

Binomial name
- Clinidium mareki Hovorka, 1997

Species of beetle

Clinidium mareki is a species of ground beetle in the subfamily Rhysodinae. It was described by Oldřich Hovorka in 1997. It is known from the northern slope of Mount Corazón in Ecuador and named after its collector, Jaroslav Marek. The type series was collected near the upper forest limit at 3,500 m (11,500 ft) above sea level in a dead, dry, charred, rotten stem.

Clinidium mareki measure 7.7–8.4 mm (0.3–0.3 in) in length.
