= Clinidium felix =

Scientific classification
- Kingdom: Animalia
- Phylum: Arthropoda
- Clade: Pancrustacea
- Class: Insecta
- Order: Coleoptera
- Suborder: Adephaga
- Family: Carabidae
- Genus: Clinidium
- Species: C. felix

Binomial name
- Clinidium felix R.T. Bell & J.R. Bell, 2009

Species of beetle

Clinidium felix is a species of ground beetle in the subfamily Rhysodinae. It was described by Ross Bell & J.R. Bell in 2009. It is only known from the Bocas del Toro Province in Panama and probably confined to Atlantic drainage of western Panama. The specific name is Latin translation of the type locality, "Fortuna".

Clinidium felix measure 6.0–7.5 mm (0.24–0.30 in) in length.
