= Centrocerum hirsuticeps =

Scientific classification
- Kingdom: Animalia
- Phylum: Arthropoda
- Class: Insecta
- Order: Coleoptera
- Suborder: Polyphaga
- Infraorder: Cucujiformia
- Family: Cerambycidae
- Genus: Centrocerum
- Species: C. hirsuticeps

Binomial name
- Centrocerum hirsuticeps Bosq, 1952

Species of beetle

Centrocerum hirsuticeps is a species of beetle in the family Cerambycidae. It was described by Bosq in 1952.
