= Clinidium oberthueri =

Scientific classification
- Kingdom: Animalia
- Phylum: Arthropoda
- Clade: Pancrustacea
- Class: Insecta
- Order: Coleoptera
- Suborder: Adephaga
- Family: Carabidae
- Genus: Clinidium
- Species: C. oberthueri

Binomial name
- Clinidium oberthueri Grouvelle, 1903

Species of beetle

Clinidium oberthueri is a species of ground beetle in the subfamily Rhysodinae. It was described by Antoine Henri Grouvelle in 1903. It is known from Ecuador where it is known with certainty from the eastern side of the Andes, and from Barbacoas, Nariño, on the other versant of the Andes in Colombia.

Clinidium oberthueri measures 6–6.3 mm (0.24–0.25 in) in length.
