= Clinidium veneficum =

Scientific classification
- Kingdom: Animalia
- Phylum: Arthropoda
- Clade: Pancrustacea
- Class: Insecta
- Order: Coleoptera
- Suborder: Adephaga
- Family: Carabidae
- Genus: Clinidium
- Species: C. veneficum

Binomial name
- Clinidium veneficum Lewis, 1888

Species of beetle

Clinidium veneficum is a species of ground beetle in the subfamily Rhysodinae. It was described by George Lewis in 1888. It is endemic to Japan and is known from Kyushu and Honshu north to Nikkō.

Clinidium veneficum measure 5.1–7.2 mm (0.20–0.28 in) in length.
