= Clinidium xenopodium =

Scientific classification
- Kingdom: Animalia
- Phylum: Arthropoda
- Clade: Pancrustacea
- Class: Insecta
- Order: Coleoptera
- Suborder: Adephaga
- Family: Carabidae
- Genus: Clinidium
- Species: C. xenopodium

Binomial name
- Clinidium xenopodium R.T. Bell, 1970

Species of beetle

Clinidium xenopodium is a species of ground beetle in the subfamily Rhysodinae. It was described by R.T. Bell in 1970. It is endemic to the Dominican Republic (Hispaniola).

Clinidium xenopodium measure 5.8–6.5 mm (0.23–0.26 in) in length.
