= Clinidium humboldti =

Scientific classification
- Kingdom: Animalia
- Phylum: Arthropoda
- Clade: Pancrustacea
- Class: Insecta
- Order: Coleoptera
- Suborder: Adephaga
- Family: Carabidae
- Genus: Clinidium
- Species: C. humboldti

Binomial name
- Clinidium humboldti R.T. Bell & J.R. Bell, 1985

Species of beetle

Clinidium humboldti is a species of ground beetle in the subfamily Rhysodinae. It was described by R.T. & J.R. Bell in 1985. It is named for Alexander von Humboldt and the Humboldt Museum, from where the holotype was borrowed. It is known from "Nueva Granada", which could be in either present-day Colombia or Panama. The holotype is a female measuring 6.4 mm (0.25 in) in length.
