= Clinidium gilloglyi =

Scientific classification
- Kingdom: Animalia
- Phylum: Arthropoda
- Clade: Pancrustacea
- Class: Insecta
- Order: Coleoptera
- Suborder: Adephaga
- Family: Carabidae
- Genus: Clinidium
- Species: C. gilloglyi

Binomial name
- Clinidium gilloglyi R.T. Bell & J.R. Bell, 2000

Species of beetle

Clinidium gilloglyi is a species of ground beetle in the subfamily Rhysodinae. It was described by R.T. & J.R. Bell in 2000.
