= Falsischnolea =

Scientific classification
- Domain: Eukaryota
- Kingdom: Animalia
- Phylum: Arthropoda
- Class: Insecta
- Order: Coleoptera
- Suborder: Polyphaga
- Infraorder: Cucujiformia
- Family: Cerambycidae
- Tribe: Apomecynini
- Genus: Falsischnolea

Genus of beetles

Falsischnolea is a genus of beetles in the family Cerambycidae, containing the following species:

- Falsischnolea apicalis Martins & Galileo, 2001
- Falsischnolea flavoapicalis Breuning, 1940
- Falsischnolea nigrobasalis Breuning, 1940
- Falsischnolea pallidipennis (Chevrolat, 1861)
