= Clinidium haitiense =

Scientific classification
- Kingdom: Animalia
- Phylum: Arthropoda
- Clade: Pancrustacea
- Class: Insecta
- Order: Coleoptera
- Suborder: Adephaga
- Family: Carabidae
- Genus: Clinidium
- Species: C. haitiense

Binomial name
- Clinidium haitiense R.T. Bell, 1970

Species of beetle

Clinidium haitiense is a species of ground beetle in the subfamily Rhysodinae. It was described by R.T.Bell in 1970. It is known from La Selle Range in Haiti. Clinidium haitiense measure 5.7–6.4 mm (0.22–0.25 in) in length.
