= Clinidium microfossatum =

Scientific classification
- Kingdom: Animalia
- Phylum: Arthropoda
- Clade: Pancrustacea
- Class: Insecta
- Order: Coleoptera
- Suborder: Adephaga
- Family: Carabidae
- Genus: Clinidium
- Species: C. microfossatum

Binomial name
- Clinidium microfossatum R.T. Bell & J.R. Bell, 1985

Species of beetle

Clinidium microfossatum is a species of ground beetle in the subfamily Rhysodinae. It was described by R.T. Bell & J.R. Bell in 1985. Clinidium microfossatum is known from Martinique (Lesser Antilles). The holotype, a male, measures 5.8 mm (0.23 in) in length.
