= Clinidium curvatum =

Scientific classification
- Kingdom: Animalia
- Phylum: Arthropoda
- Clade: Pancrustacea
- Class: Insecta
- Order: Coleoptera
- Suborder: Adephaga
- Family: Carabidae
- Genus: Clinidium
- Species: C. curvatum

Binomial name
- Clinidium curvatum R.T. Bell & J.R. Bell, 1985

Species of beetle

Clinidium curvatum is a species of ground beetle in the subfamily Rhysodinae. It was described by R.T. Bell & J.R. Bell in 1985. It is known from Oroque in Norte de Santander Department, Colombia. The holotype is a male measuring 6.2 mm (0.24 in) in length.
