= Clinidium argus =

Scientific classification
- Kingdom: Animalia
- Phylum: Arthropoda
- Clade: Pancrustacea
- Class: Insecta
- Order: Coleoptera
- Suborder: Adephaga
- Family: Carabidae
- Genus: Clinidium
- Species: C. argus

Binomial name
- Clinidium argus R.T. Bell & J.R. Bell, 1985

Species of beetle

Clinidium argus is a species of ground beetle in the subfamily Rhysodinae. It was described by R.T. Bell & J.R. Bell in 1985. The holotype is labelled as originating from "Philippines, Horns of Negros", but this is considered questionable. The holotype is a male measuring 6.6 mm (0.26 in) in length.
