= Clinidium insigne =

Scientific classification
- Kingdom: Animalia
- Phylum: Arthropoda
- Clade: Pancrustacea
- Class: Insecta
- Order: Coleoptera
- Suborder: Adephaga
- Family: Carabidae
- Genus: Clinidium
- Species: C. insigne

Binomial name
- Clinidium insigne Grouvelle, 1903

Species of beetle

Clinidium insigne is a species of ground beetle in the subfamily Rhysodinae. It was described by Antoine Henri Grouvelle in 1903. It is known from Ecuador (several locations, including its type locality), provisionally from Cali, Colombia, and Yacambú National Park in Venezuela.

Clinidium insigne measures 7–7.4 mm (0.28–0.29 in) in length.
