= Falsischnolea apicalis =

Scientific classification
- Domain: Eukaryota
- Kingdom: Animalia
- Phylum: Arthropoda
- Class: Insecta
- Order: Coleoptera
- Suborder: Polyphaga
- Infraorder: Cucujiformia
- Family: Cerambycidae
- Genus: Falsischnolea
- Species: F. apicalis

Binomial name
- Falsischnolea apicalis Martins & Galileo, 2001

Species of beetle

Falsischnolea apicalis is a species of beetle in the family Cerambycidae. It was described by Martins and Galileo in 2001.
