= Ischnolea piim =

Scientific classification
- Domain: Eukaryota
- Kingdom: Animalia
- Phylum: Arthropoda
- Class: Insecta
- Order: Coleoptera
- Suborder: Polyphaga
- Infraorder: Cucujiformia
- Family: Cerambycidae
- Genus: Ischnolea
- Species: I. piim

Binomial name
- Ischnolea piim Galileo & Martins, 1996

Species of beetle

Ischnolea piim is a species of beetle in the family Cerambycidae. It was described by Galileo and Martins in 1996. It is known from Brazil.
