= Clinidium spatulatum =

Scientific classification
- Kingdom: Animalia
- Phylum: Arthropoda
- Clade: Pancrustacea
- Class: Insecta
- Order: Coleoptera
- Suborder: Adephaga
- Family: Carabidae
- Genus: Clinidium
- Species: C. spatulatum

Binomial name
- Clinidium spatulatum R.T. Bell & J.R. Bell, 1985

Species of beetle

Clinidium spatulatum is a species of ground beetle in the subfamily Rhysodinae. It was described by R.T. Bell & J.R. Bell in 1985. Its type locality is Santa Rita Ridge in Colón Province, Panama. Primarily a Panamanian species, its range extends to Osa Peninsula in southeastern Costa Rica. There is also a female collected from Gorgona Island (Colombia), which could well be a distinct species endemic to that island, but which has tentatively been assigned to this species, awaiting better material.

The holotype of Clinidium spatulatum is a female measuring 6.6 mm (0.26 in) in length.
