= Centrocerum richteri =

Scientific classification
- Kingdom: Animalia
- Phylum: Arthropoda
- Class: Insecta
- Order: Coleoptera
- Suborder: Polyphaga
- Infraorder: Cucujiformia
- Family: Cerambycidae
- Genus: Centrocerum
- Species: C. richteri

Binomial name
- Centrocerum richteri Bruch, 1911

Species of beetle

Centrocerum richteri is a species of beetle in the family Cerambycidae. It was described by Bruch in 1911.
