= Ischnolea flavinota =

Scientific classification
- Domain: Eukaryota
- Kingdom: Animalia
- Phylum: Arthropoda
- Class: Insecta
- Order: Coleoptera
- Suborder: Polyphaga
- Infraorder: Cucujiformia
- Family: Cerambycidae
- Genus: Ischnolea
- Species: I. flavinota

Binomial name
- Ischnolea flavinota Galileo & Martins, 1993

Species of beetle

Ischnolea flavinota is a species of beetle in the family Cerambycidae. It was described by Galileo and Martins in 1993. It is known from Brazil and Paraguay.
