= Crioprosopus thoracicus =

Scientific classification
- Kingdom: Animalia
- Phylum: Arthropoda
- Class: Insecta
- Order: Coleoptera
- Suborder: Polyphaga
- Infraorder: Cucujiformia
- Family: Cerambycidae
- Genus: Crioprosopus
- Species: C. thoracicus

Binomial name
- Crioprosopus thoracicus (Bates, 1892)

Species of beetle

Crioprosopus thoracicus is a species of long-horned beetle in the family Cerambycidae. It was described by Henry Walter Bates in 1892.
