= Atelodesmis mannerheimii =

Scientific classification
- Domain: Eukaryota
- Kingdom: Animalia
- Phylum: Arthropoda
- Class: Insecta
- Order: Coleoptera
- Suborder: Polyphaga
- Infraorder: Cucujiformia
- Family: Cerambycidae
- Genus: Atelodesmis
- Species: A. mannerheimii

Binomial name
- Atelodesmis mannerheimii Duponchel & Chevrolat, 1841

Synonyms
- Atelodesmis vestita Dejean, 1835; Atelodesmis vestita Dejean, 1836; Atelodesmis hirticornis Buquet, 1857; Atelodesmis vestita Buquet, 1857

Species of beetle

Atelodesmis mannerheimii is a species of beetle in the family Cerambycidae. It was described by Duponchel & Chevrolat in 1841. It is known from Brazil.
