= Clinidium triplehorni =

Scientific classification
- Kingdom: Animalia
- Phylum: Arthropoda
- Clade: Pancrustacea
- Class: Insecta
- Order: Coleoptera
- Suborder: Adephaga
- Family: Carabidae
- Genus: Clinidium
- Species: C. triplehorni

Binomial name
- Clinidium triplehorni R.T. Bell & J.R. Bell, 1985

Species of beetle

Clinidium triplehorni is a species of ground beetle in the subfamily Rhysodinae. It was described by R.T. & J.R. Bell in 1985. It is named after Charles Triplehorn, the collector of the type series. It is known from the Mexican state of Hidalgo. Specimens in the type series measure 6–6.7 mm (0.24–0.26 in) in length.
