= Centrocerum =

Scientific classification
- Kingdom: Animalia
- Phylum: Arthropoda
- Class: Insecta
- Order: Coleoptera
- Suborder: Polyphaga
- Infraorder: Cucujiformia
- Family: Cerambycidae
- Subfamily: Cerambycinae
- Tribe: Elaphidiini
- Genus: Centrocerum; Chevrolat, 1861

Genus of beetles

Centrocerum is a genus of beetles in the family Cerambycidae, containing the following species:

- Centrocerum divisum Martins & Monné, 1975
- Centrocerum elegans Chevrolat, 1861
- Centrocerum exornatum (Newman, 1841)
- Centrocerum hirsuticeps Bosq, 1952
- Centrocerum richteri Bruch, 1911
