= Clinidium pala =

Scientific classification
- Kingdom: Animalia
- Phylum: Arthropoda
- Clade: Pancrustacea
- Class: Insecta
- Order: Coleoptera
- Suborder: Adephaga
- Family: Carabidae
- Genus: Clinidium
- Species: C. pala

Binomial name
- Clinidium pala R.T. Bell & J.R. Bell, 1985

Species of beetle

Clinidium pala is a species of ground beetle in the subfamily Rhysodinae. It was described by R.T. Bell & J.R. Bell in 1985. It is known from its type locality in Guatopo National Park, northern Venezuela. Clinidium pala measure 5–5.5 mm (0.20–0.22 in) in length.
