= Clinidium iviei =

Scientific classification
- Kingdom: Animalia
- Phylum: Arthropoda
- Clade: Pancrustacea
- Class: Insecta
- Order: Coleoptera
- Suborder: Adephaga
- Family: Carabidae
- Genus: Clinidium
- Species: C. iviei

Binomial name
- Clinidium iviei R.T. Bell & J.R. Bell, 1985

Species of beetle

Clinidium iviei is a species of ground beetle in the subfamily Rhysodinae. It was described by R.T. & J.R. Bell in 1985. It is named after Michael A. Ivie, the collector of the type series. It is known from the Mexican state of Oaxaca. Specimens in the type series measure 6.2–8 mm (0.24–0.31 in) in length.
