= Clinidium sculptile =

Scientific classification
- Kingdom: Animalia
- Phylum: Arthropoda
- Clade: Pancrustacea
- Class: Insecta
- Order: Coleoptera
- Suborder: Adephaga
- Family: Carabidae
- Subfamily: Rhysodinae
- Genus: Clinidium
- Species: C. sculptile

Binomial name
- Clinidium sculptile (E. Newman, 1838)

Synonyms
- Rhysodes sculptilis Newman, 1838; Rhysodes conjungens Germar, 1840

Species of beetle

Clinidium sculptile is a species of ground beetle in the subfamily Rhysodinae. It was described by Edward Newman in 1838. It is endemic to the eastern United States, primarily Appalachia. It has been recorded on pitch pine (Pinus rigida) and tulip tree (Liriodendron tulipifera).

Clinidium sculptile measure 6.5–7.6 mm (0.26–0.30 in) in length.
