= Clinidium chevrolati =

Scientific classification
- Kingdom: Animalia
- Phylum: Arthropoda
- Clade: Pancrustacea
- Class: Insecta
- Order: Coleoptera
- Suborder: Adephaga
- Family: Carabidae
- Genus: Clinidium
- Species: C. chevrolati

Binomial name
- Clinidium chevrolati Reitter, 1880

Synonyms
- Clinidium turquinense Bell, 1970

Species of beetle

Clinidium chevrolati is a species of ground beetle in the subfamily Rhysodinae. It was described by Edmund Reitter in 1880. It is known with some certainty only from Pico Turquino in the Sierra Maestra, Cuba—the type locality of Clinidium turquinense—the type locality of Clinidium chevrolati, "Neu Granada", seems to be in error.

Clinidium chevrolati measure 6.8–7 mm (0.27–0.28 in) in length.
