= Clinidium boroquense =

Scientific classification
- Kingdom: Animalia
- Phylum: Arthropoda
- Clade: Pancrustacea
- Class: Insecta
- Order: Coleoptera
- Suborder: Adephaga
- Family: Carabidae
- Genus: Clinidium
- Species: C. boroquense

Binomial name
- Clinidium boroquense R.T. Bell, 1970

Species of beetle

Clinidium boroquense is a species of ground beetle in the subfamily Rhysodinae. It was described by R.T. Bell in 1970. It is endemic to Puerto Rico.

Clinidium boroquense measure 4–5.9 mm (0.16–0.23 in) in length.
