= Crioprosopus servillei =

Scientific classification
- Domain: Eukaryota
- Kingdom: Animalia
- Phylum: Arthropoda
- Class: Insecta
- Order: Coleoptera
- Suborder: Polyphaga
- Infraorder: Cucujiformia
- Family: Cerambycidae
- Genus: Crioprosopus
- Species: C. servillei

Binomial name
- Crioprosopus servillei Audinet-Serville, 1834

Species of beetle

Crioprosopus servillei is a species of long-horned beetle in the family Cerambycidae.
