= Clinidium rosenbergi =

Scientific classification
- Kingdom: Animalia
- Phylum: Arthropoda
- Clade: Pancrustacea
- Class: Insecta
- Order: Coleoptera
- Suborder: Adephaga
- Family: Carabidae
- Subfamily: Rhysodinae
- Genus: Clinidium
- Species: C. rosenbergi

Binomial name
- Clinidium rosenbergi R.T. Bell, 1970

Species of beetle

Clinidium rosenbergi is a species of ground beetle in the subfamily Rhysodinae. It was described by R.T. Bell in 1970. It is endemic to the United States, primarily to the eastern United States east to the Appalachian Mountains, but it reaches the Delaware River in Pennsylvania and is found west of the Mississippi River in Missouri.

Clinidium rosenbergi measure 6.2–7.8 mm (0.24–0.31 in) in length.
