= Clinidium baitense =

Scientific classification
- Kingdom: Animalia
- Phylum: Arthropoda
- Clade: Pancrustacea
- Class: Insecta
- Order: Coleoptera
- Suborder: Adephaga
- Family: Carabidae
- Genus: Clinidium
- Species: C. baitense

Binomial name
- Clinidium baitense R.T. Bell, 1970

Species of beetle

Clinidium baitense is a species of ground beetle in the subfamily Rhysodinae. It was described by R.T.Bell in 1970.
