= Clinidium dormans =

Scientific classification
- Kingdom: Animalia
- Phylum: Arthropoda
- Clade: Pancrustacea
- Class: Insecta
- Order: Coleoptera
- Suborder: Adephaga
- Family: Carabidae
- Genus: Clinidium
- Species: C. dormans

Binomial name
- Clinidium dormans R.T. Bell & J.R. Bell, 1985

Species of beetle

Clinidium dormans is a species of ground beetle in the subfamily Rhysodinae. It was described by R.T. Bell & J.R. Bell in 1985. It is known from Chiriquí Province, Panama. The holotype is a male measuring 5.2 mm (0.20 in) in length.
