= Clinidium darlingtoni =

Scientific classification
- Kingdom: Animalia
- Phylum: Arthropoda
- Clade: Pancrustacea
- Class: Insecta
- Order: Coleoptera
- Suborder: Adephaga
- Family: Carabidae
- Genus: Clinidium
- Species: C. darlingtoni

Binomial name
- Clinidium darlingtoni R.T. Bell, 1970

Species of beetle

Clinidium darlingtoni is a species of ground beetle in the subfamily Rhysodinae. It was described by R.T. Bell in 1970. It is endemic to Jamaica.

Clinidium darlingtoni measure 4.9–6.7 mm (0.19–0.26 in) in length.
