= Clinidium dubium =

Scientific classification
- Kingdom: Animalia
- Phylum: Arthropoda
- Clade: Pancrustacea
- Class: Insecta
- Order: Coleoptera
- Suborder: Adephaga
- Family: Carabidae
- Genus: Clinidium
- Species: C. dubium

Binomial name
- Clinidium dubium Grouvelle, 1903

Species of beetle

Clinidium dubium is a species of ground beetle in the subfamily Rhysodinae. It was described by Antoine Henri Grouvelle in 1903. It is known from Loja, Ecuador. The holotype measures 5.7 mm (0.22 in) in length.
