= Clinidium mathani =

Scientific classification
- Kingdom: Animalia
- Phylum: Arthropoda
- Clade: Pancrustacea
- Class: Insecta
- Order: Coleoptera
- Suborder: Adephaga
- Family: Carabidae
- Genus: Clinidium
- Species: C. mathani

Binomial name
- Clinidium mathani Grouvelle, 1903

Species of beetle

Clinidium mathani is a species of ground beetle in the subfamily Rhysodinae. It was described by Antoine Henri Grouvelle in 1903. Originally known from the Amazon Basin of Brazil—its type locality is in the Amazonas State, near the border with Peru and Colombia, and there is another record from Amapá—it is now also known from the Colombian Andes in the Cordillera de los Picachos National Natural Park (Caquetá) and from near Inzá (Cauca). It is named after collector of the holotype, M. de Mathan.

Clinidium mathani measure 6.3 mm (0.25 in) in length.
