= Centrocerum divisum =

Scientific classification
- Kingdom: Animalia
- Phylum: Arthropoda
- Class: Insecta
- Order: Coleoptera
- Suborder: Polyphaga
- Infraorder: Cucujiformia
- Family: Cerambycidae
- Genus: Centrocerum
- Species: C. divisum

Binomial name
- Centrocerum divisum Martins & Monné, 1975

Species of beetle

Centrocerum divisum is a species of beetle in the family Cerambycidae. It was described by Martins and Monné in 1975.
