= Clinidium dux =

Scientific classification
- Kingdom: Animalia
- Phylum: Arthropoda
- Clade: Pancrustacea
- Class: Insecta
- Order: Coleoptera
- Suborder: Adephaga
- Family: Carabidae
- Genus: Clinidium
- Species: C. dux

Binomial name
- Clinidium dux R.T. Bell & J.R. Bell, 2009

Species of beetle

Clinidium dux is a species of ground beetle in the subfamily Rhysodinae. It was described by Ross Bell & J.R. Bell in 2009. It is only known from the holotype, a female, collected from the island of Marinduque, the Philippines. The taxonomic affinities of this species remain uncertain as male specimens are unknown. The specific name refers to the type locality, duque (="duke") being derived from the Latin dux, meaning "leader".

Clinidium dux holotype measures 7.5 mm (0.30 in) in length.
