= Clinidium poinari =

Clinidium poinari Temporal range: probably Miocene

Scientific classification
- Kingdom: Animalia
- Phylum: Arthropoda
- Clade: Pancrustacea
- Class: Insecta
- Order: Coleoptera
- Suborder: Adephaga
- Family: Carabidae
- Genus: Clinidium
- Species: †C. poinari

Binomial name
- †Clinidium poinari R.T. Bell & J.R. Bell, 2009

Species of beetle

Clinidium poinari is a species of ground beetle in the subfamily Rhysodinae. It was described by Ross Bell & J.R. Bell in 2009 and named after entomologist George Poinar Jr. The description was based on two male specimens in amber from the Dominican Republic.

Clinidium poinari measures about 7 mm (0.3 in) in length.
