= Clinidium grimaldii =

Clinidium grimaldii Temporal range: Oligocene–Miocene

Scientific classification
- Kingdom: Animalia
- Phylum: Arthropoda
- Clade: Pancrustacea
- Class: Insecta
- Order: Coleoptera
- Suborder: Adephaga
- Family: Carabidae
- Genus: Clinidium
- Species: †C. grimaldii

Binomial name
- †Clinidium grimaldii R.T. Bell & J.R. Bell, 2009

Species of beetle

Clinidium grimaldii is a species of ground beetle in the subfamily Rhysodinae. It was described by Ross Bell & J.R. Bell in 2009 and named after entomologist David Grimaldi. The description was based on a male specimen (the holotype) originating from Oligo–Miocene amber from the Dominican Republic.

Clinidium grimaldii holotype measures about 6 mm (0.2 in) in length (exact measurement is not possible because the elytral apex is missing).
