= Ischnolea =

Scientific classification
- Domain: Eukaryota
- Kingdom: Animalia
- Phylum: Arthropoda
- Class: Insecta
- Order: Coleoptera
- Suborder: Polyphaga
- Infraorder: Cucujiformia
- Family: Cerambycidae
- Tribe: Desmiphorini
- Genus: Ischnolea

Genus of beetles

Ischnolea is a genus of longhorn beetles of the subfamily Lamiinae, containing the following species:

- Ischnolea bicolorata Galileo & Martins, 2007
- Ischnolea bimaculata Chevrolat, 1861
- Ischnolea crinita Thomson, 1860
- Ischnolea flavinota Galileo & Martins, 1993
- Ischnolea flavofemorata Breuning, 1943
- Ischnolea indistincta Breuning, 1942
- Ischnolea inexpectata Galileo & Martins, 1993
- Ischnolea longeantennata Breuning, 1942
- Ischnolea modesta Galileo & Martins, 1993
- Ischnolea oculata Galileo & Martins, 1993
- Ischnolea odettae Martins, Galileo & Tavakilian, 2008
- Ischnolea peruana Breuning, 1943
- Ischnolea piim Galileo & Martins, 1996
- Ischnolea singularis Galileo & Martins, 1993
- Ischnolea spinipennis Breuning, 1943
- Ischnolea strandi Breuning, 1942
