= Clinidium moldenkei =

Scientific classification
- Kingdom: Animalia
- Phylum: Arthropoda
- Clade: Pancrustacea
- Class: Insecta
- Order: Coleoptera
- Suborder: Adephaga
- Family: Carabidae
- Genus: Clinidium
- Species: C. moldenkei

Binomial name
- Clinidium moldenkei R.T. Bell & J.R. Bell, 1985

Species of beetle

Clinidium moldenkei is a species of ground beetle in the subfamily Rhysodinae. It was described by R.T. Bell & J.R. Bell in 1985. It is endemic to the Golfo Dulce region in Puntarenas Province, Costa Rica. The species is named for the coleopterist Andrew R. Moldenke, collector of the holotype.

Clinidium moldenkei measure 6.8–7.8 mm (0.27–0.31 in) in length.
