= Clinidium whiteheadi =

Scientific classification
- Kingdom: Animalia
- Phylum: Arthropoda
- Clade: Pancrustacea
- Class: Insecta
- Order: Coleoptera
- Suborder: Adephaga
- Family: Carabidae
- Genus: Clinidium
- Species: C. whiteheadi

Binomial name
- Clinidium whiteheadi R.T. Bell & J.R. Bell, 1985

Species of beetle

Clinidium whiteheadi is a species of ground beetle in the subfamily Rhysodinae. It was described by R.T. & J.R. Bell in 1985. It is named for Donald R. Whitehead. It is known from Cerro Campana in Panama. The types were collected from the fruiting bodies of the slime mold Stemonitis:

Clinidium whiteheadi measure 5–5.8 mm (0.20–0.23 in) in length.
