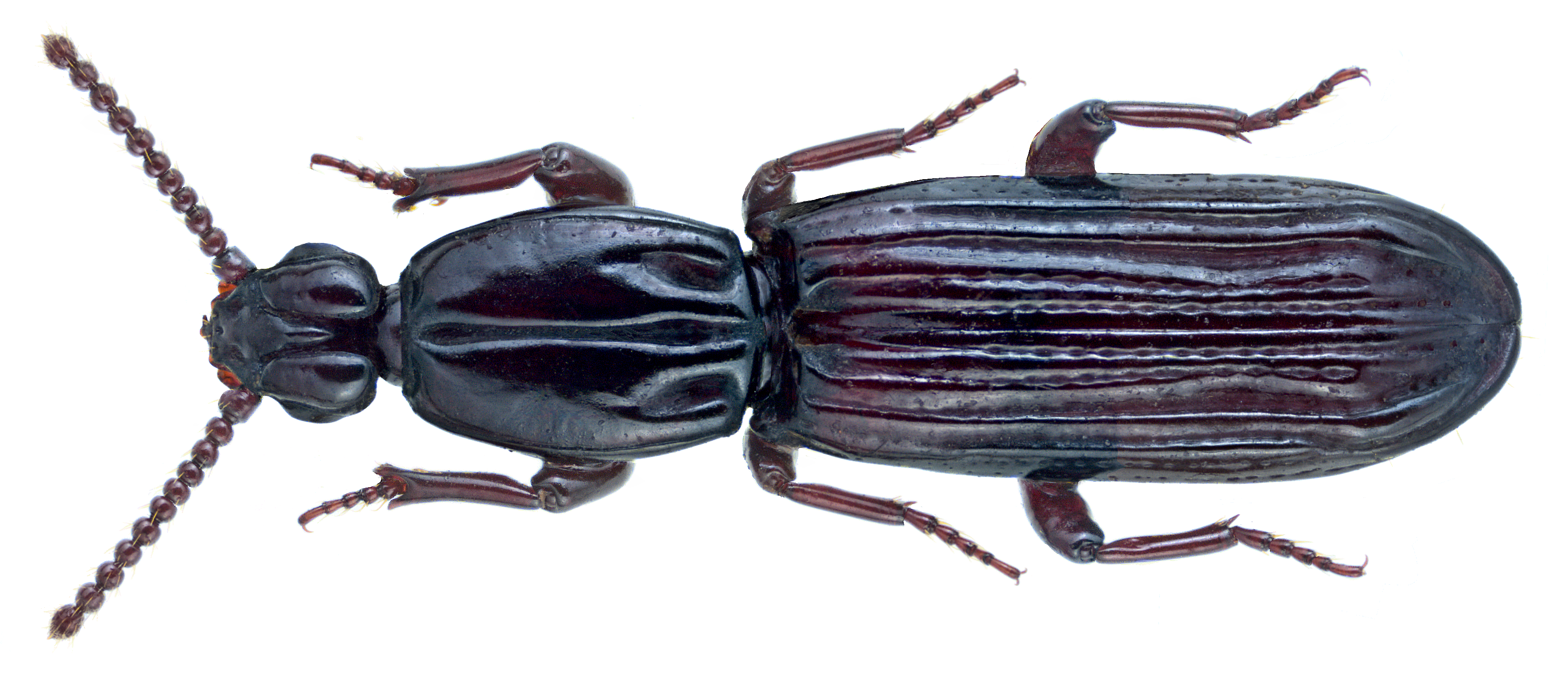

Scientific classification
- Kingdom: Animalia
- Phylum: Arthropoda
- Clade: Pancrustacea
- Class: Insecta
- Order: Coleoptera
- Suborder: Adephaga
- Family: Carabidae
- Genus: Clinidium
- Species: C. marginicolle

Binomial name
- Clinidium marginicolle Reitter, 1889

= Clinidium marginicolle =

Species of beetle

Clinidium marginicolle is a species of ground beetle in the subfamily Rhysodinae. It was described by Edmund Reitter in 1889. It is known Azerbaijan and northeastern Iran (Kopet Dag).

Clinidium marginicolle measure 5.8–7.5 mm (0.23–0.30 in) in length.
