= Clinidium extrarium =

Scientific classification
- Kingdom: Animalia
- Phylum: Arthropoda
- Clade: Pancrustacea
- Class: Insecta
- Order: Coleoptera
- Suborder: Adephaga
- Family: Carabidae
- Genus: Clinidium
- Species: C. extrarium

Binomial name
- Clinidium extrarium R.T. Bell & J.R. Bell, 1978

Species of beetle

Clinidium extrarium is a species of ground beetle in the subfamily Rhysodinae. It was described by R.T. & J.R. Bell in 1978. The type series originates from "N. Amerika"; the specific locality is unknown but likely was in the tropical lowlands of Mexico or northern Central America.

Clinidium extrarium measure 6.1–6.3 mm (0.24–0.25 in) in length.
