= Crioprosopus saundersii =

Scientific classification
- Domain: Eukaryota
- Kingdom: Animalia
- Phylum: Arthropoda
- Class: Insecta
- Order: Coleoptera
- Suborder: Polyphaga
- Infraorder: Cucujiformia
- Family: Cerambycidae
- Genus: Crioprosopus
- Species: C. saundersii

Binomial name
- Crioprosopus saundersii White, 1853

Species of beetle

Crioprosopus saundersii is a species of beetle in the family Cerambycidae. It was described by White in 1853.
