= Clinidium segne =

Scientific classification
- Kingdom: Animalia
- Phylum: Arthropoda
- Clade: Pancrustacea
- Class: Insecta
- Order: Coleoptera
- Suborder: Adephaga
- Family: Carabidae
- Genus: Clinidium
- Species: C. segne

Binomial name
- Clinidium segne R.T. Bell & J.R. Bell, 1985

Species of beetle

Clinidium segne is a species of ground beetle in the subfamily Rhysodinae. It was described by R.T. Bell & J.R. Bell in 1985. It is known from the Aragua state in northern Venezuela. Clinidium segne females measure 4.6–5.2 mm (0.18–0.20 in) in length.
