= Clinidium excavatum =

Scientific classification
- Kingdom: Animalia
- Phylum: Arthropoda
- Clade: Pancrustacea
- Class: Insecta
- Order: Coleoptera
- Suborder: Adephaga
- Family: Carabidae
- Genus: Clinidium
- Species: C. excavatum

Binomial name
- Clinidium excavatum R.T. Bell & J.R. Bell, 1985

Species of beetle

Clinidium excavatum is a species of ground beetle in the subfamily Rhysodinae. It was described by R.T. Bell & J.R. Bell in 1985. It is known from its type locality in Carabobo, northern Venezuela. Clinidium excavatum measure 6.5–6.8 mm (0.26–0.27 in) in length.
