= Ischnolea odettae =

Scientific classification
- Domain: Eukaryota
- Kingdom: Animalia
- Phylum: Arthropoda
- Class: Insecta
- Order: Coleoptera
- Suborder: Polyphaga
- Infraorder: Cucujiformia
- Family: Cerambycidae
- Genus: Ischnolea
- Species: I. odettae

Binomial name
- Ischnolea odettae Martins, Galileo & Tavakilian, 2008

Species of beetle

Ischnolea odettae is a species of beetle in the family Cerambycidae. It was described by Martins, Galileo and Tavakilian in 2008. It is known from French Guiana.
