= Clinidium balli =

Scientific classification
- Kingdom: Animalia
- Phylum: Arthropoda
- Clade: Pancrustacea
- Class: Insecta
- Order: Coleoptera
- Suborder: Adephaga
- Family: Carabidae
- Genus: Clinidium
- Species: C. balli

Binomial name
- Clinidium balli R.T. Bell & J.R. Bell, 1985

Species of beetle

Clinidium balli is a species of ground beetle in the subfamily Rhysodinae. It was described by R.T. & J.R. Bell in 1985. It is named after George Ball, a friend of the describers of this species. It is known from the Mexican state of Hidalgo. Specimens in the type series measure 5–6 mm (0.20–0.24 in) in length.
