= Clinidium impressum =

Scientific classification
- Kingdom: Animalia
- Phylum: Arthropoda
- Clade: Pancrustacea
- Class: Insecta
- Order: Coleoptera
- Suborder: Adephaga
- Family: Carabidae
- Genus: Clinidium
- Species: C. impressum

Binomial name
- Clinidium impressum R.T. Bell & J.R. Bell, 1985

Species of beetle

Clinidium impressum is a species of ground beetle in the subfamily Rhysodinae. It was described by Ross T. Bell & J.R. Bell in 1985. It is known from French Guiana and Guyana. Male measures 5.3 mm (0.21 in) and females measure 6–6.2 mm (0.24–0.24 in) in length.
