= Clinidium foveolatum =

Scientific classification
- Kingdom: Animalia
- Phylum: Arthropoda
- Clade: Pancrustacea
- Class: Insecta
- Order: Coleoptera
- Suborder: Adephaga
- Family: Carabidae
- Genus: Clinidium
- Species: C. foveolatum

Binomial name
- Clinidium foveolatum Grouvelle, 1903

Species of beetle

Clinidium foveolatum is a species of ground beetle in the subfamily Rhysodinae. It was described by Antoine Henri Grouvelle in 1903. It is known from Ecuador.

The holotype, a female, measures 6.7 mm (0.26 in) in length.
