= Clinidium newtoni =

Scientific classification
- Kingdom: Animalia
- Phylum: Arthropoda
- Clade: Pancrustacea
- Class: Insecta
- Order: Coleoptera
- Suborder: Adephaga
- Family: Carabidae
- Genus: Clinidium
- Species: C. newtoni

Binomial name
- Clinidium newtoni R.T. Bell & J.R. Bell, 1985

Species of beetle

Clinidium newtoni is a species of ground beetle in the subfamily Rhysodinae. It was described by Ross T. Bell & J.R. Bell in 1985. It is known from near Pueblo Nuevo Solistahuacán in Chiapas (southern Mexico) and from Francisco Morazán and Ocotepeque Departments in Honduras. The Honduran specimens were found under bark.

Clinidium newtoni is named after entomologist Alfred F. Newton, the collector of the holotype. The holotype is a male measuring 7 mm (0.28 in) in length.
