= Ischnolea crinita =

Scientific classification
- Domain: Eukaryota
- Kingdom: Animalia
- Phylum: Arthropoda
- Class: Insecta
- Order: Coleoptera
- Suborder: Polyphaga
- Infraorder: Cucujiformia
- Family: Cerambycidae
- Genus: Ischnolea
- Species: I. crinita

Binomial name
- Ischnolea crinita Thomson, 1860

Species of beetle

Ischnolea crinita is a species of beetle in the family Cerambycidae. It was described by Thomson in 1860. It is known from Brazil and Ecuador.
