= Triammatus chevrolati =

Scientific classification
- Kingdom: Animalia
- Phylum: Arthropoda
- Clade: Pancrustacea
- Class: Insecta
- Order: Coleoptera
- Suborder: Polyphaga
- Infraorder: Cucujiformia
- Family: Cerambycidae
- Genus: Triammatus
- Species: T. chevrolati

Binomial name
- Triammatus chevrolati Pascoe, 1856

Synonyms
- Combe chevrolati (Pascoe, 1856)

Species of beetle

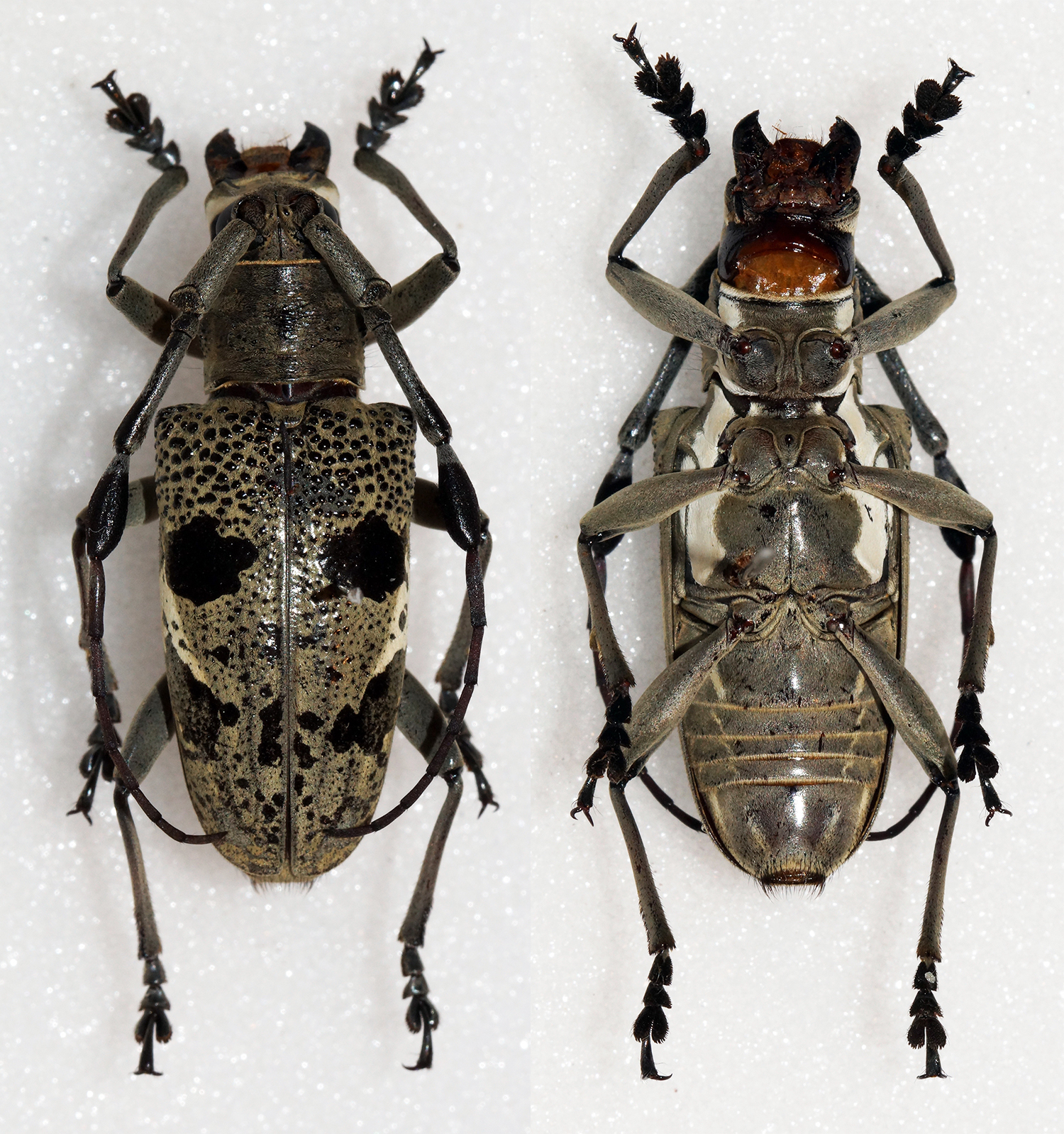
Triammatus chevrolati

Triammatus chevrolati is a species of beetle in the family Cerambycidae. It was described by Francis Polkinghorne Pascoe in 1856. It is known from Borneo, the Malayan Peninsula and Sumatra.
