= Dadoychus =

Scientific classification
- Kingdom: Animalia
- Phylum: Arthropoda
- Class: Insecta
- Order: Coleoptera
- Suborder: Polyphaga
- Infraorder: Cucujiformia
- Family: Cerambycidae
- Subfamily: Lamiinae
- Tribe: Hemilophini
- Genus: Dadoychus

Genus of beetles

Dadoychus is a genus of longhorn beetles of the subfamily Lamiinae, containing the following species:

- Dadoychus flavocinctus Chevrolat, 1833
- Dadoychus mucuim Galileo & Martins, 1998
- Dadoychus nigrus Galileo & Martins, 2009
