= Clinidium rossi =

Scientific classification
- Kingdom: Animalia
- Phylum: Arthropoda
- Clade: Pancrustacea
- Class: Insecta
- Order: Coleoptera
- Suborder: Adephaga
- Family: Carabidae
- Genus: Clinidium
- Species: C. rossi

Binomial name
- Clinidium rossi R.T. Bell, 1970

Species of beetle

Clinidium rossi is a species of ground beetle in the subfamily Rhysodinae. It was described by Ross Bell in 1970. It is known from Golfito in Costa Rica. The holotype, a male, measures 4.1 mm (0.16 in) in length.
