= Clinidium guildingii =

Scientific classification
- Kingdom: Animalia
- Phylum: Arthropoda
- Clade: Pancrustacea
- Class: Insecta
- Order: Coleoptera
- Suborder: Adephaga
- Family: Carabidae
- Genus: Clinidium
- Species: C. guildingii

Binomial name
- Clinidium guildingii Kirby, 1830

Species of beetle

Clinidium guildingii is a species of ground beetle in the subfamily Rhysodinae. It was described by William Forsell Kirby in 1830. Clinidium guildingii is endemic to Saint Vincent (Lesser Antilles). It measures 5.5–6 mm (0.22–0.24 in) in length.
