= Triammatus tristis =

Scientific classification
- Kingdom: Animalia
- Phylum: Arthropoda
- Class: Insecta
- Order: Coleoptera
- Suborder: Polyphaga
- Infraorder: Cucujiformia
- Family: Cerambycidae
- Genus: Triammatus
- Species: T. tristis

Binomial name
- Triammatus tristis Pascoe, 1860

Species of beetle

Triammatus tristis is a species of beetle in the family Cerambycidae. It was described by Francis Polkinghorne Pascoe in 1860. It is known from Borneo and Moluccas.

== Subspecies ==
- Triammatus tristis tristis Pascoe, 1860
- Triammatus tristis juheli Jiroux, Garreau, Bentanachs & Prévost, 2016
