= Clinidium centrale =

Scientific classification
- Kingdom: Animalia
- Phylum: Arthropoda
- Clade: Pancrustacea
- Class: Insecta
- Order: Coleoptera
- Suborder: Adephaga
- Family: Carabidae
- Genus: Clinidium
- Species: C. centrale

Binomial name
- Clinidium centrale Grouvelle, 1903

Species of beetle

Clinidium centrale is a species of ground beetle in the subfamily Rhysodinae. It was described by Antoine Henri Grouvelle in 1903. It is endemic to Costa Rica. Clinidium centrale measure 6–7.4 mm (0.24–0.29 in) in length.
