= Ischnolea bicolorata =

Scientific classification
- Domain: Eukaryota
- Kingdom: Animalia
- Phylum: Arthropoda
- Class: Insecta
- Order: Coleoptera
- Suborder: Polyphaga
- Infraorder: Cucujiformia
- Family: Cerambycidae
- Genus: Ischnolea
- Species: I. bicolorata

Binomial name
- Ischnolea bicolorata Galileo & Martins, 2007

Species of beetle

Ischnolea bicolorata is a species of beetle in the family Cerambycidae. It was described by Galileo and Martins in 2007. It is known from Bolivia.
