= Clinidium incis =

Scientific classification
- Kingdom: Animalia
- Phylum: Arthropoda
- Clade: Pancrustacea
- Class: Insecta
- Order: Coleoptera
- Suborder: Adephaga
- Family: Carabidae
- Genus: Clinidium
- Species: C. incis

Binomial name
- Clinidium incis R.T. Bell, 1970

Synonyms
- Clinidium incudis – emendation

Species of beetle

Clinidium incis is a species of ground beetle in the subfamily Rhysodinae. It was described by R.T. Bell in 1970. It is endemic to Puerto Rico. The specific name is derived from the Latin incus and refers to the type locality, El Yunque, which is the Spanish word for anvil. Grammatically, the spelling should have been incudis ("of the anvil").

Clinidium incis measure 6.1–7.5 mm (0.24–0.30 in) in length.
