= Clinidium jamaicense =

Scientific classification
- Kingdom: Animalia
- Phylum: Arthropoda
- Clade: Pancrustacea
- Class: Insecta
- Order: Coleoptera
- Suborder: Adephaga
- Family: Carabidae
- Genus: Clinidium
- Species: C. jamaicense

Binomial name
- Clinidium jamaicense Arrow, 1942

Species of beetle

Clinidium jamaicense is a species of ground beetle in the subfamily Rhysodinae. It was described by Gilbert John Arrow in 1942. It is endemic to Jamaica. Clinidium jamaicense measure 4.6–5.7 mm (0.18–0.22 in) in length.
