= Dadoychus nigrus =

Scientific classification
- Kingdom: Animalia
- Phylum: Arthropoda
- Class: Insecta
- Order: Coleoptera
- Suborder: Polyphaga
- Infraorder: Cucujiformia
- Family: Cerambycidae
- Genus: Dadoychus
- Species: D. nigrus

Binomial name
- Dadoychus nigrus Galileo & Martins, 2009

Species of beetle

Dadoychus nigrus is a species of beetle in the family Cerambycidae. It was described by Galileo and Martins in 2009. It is known from Brazil.
