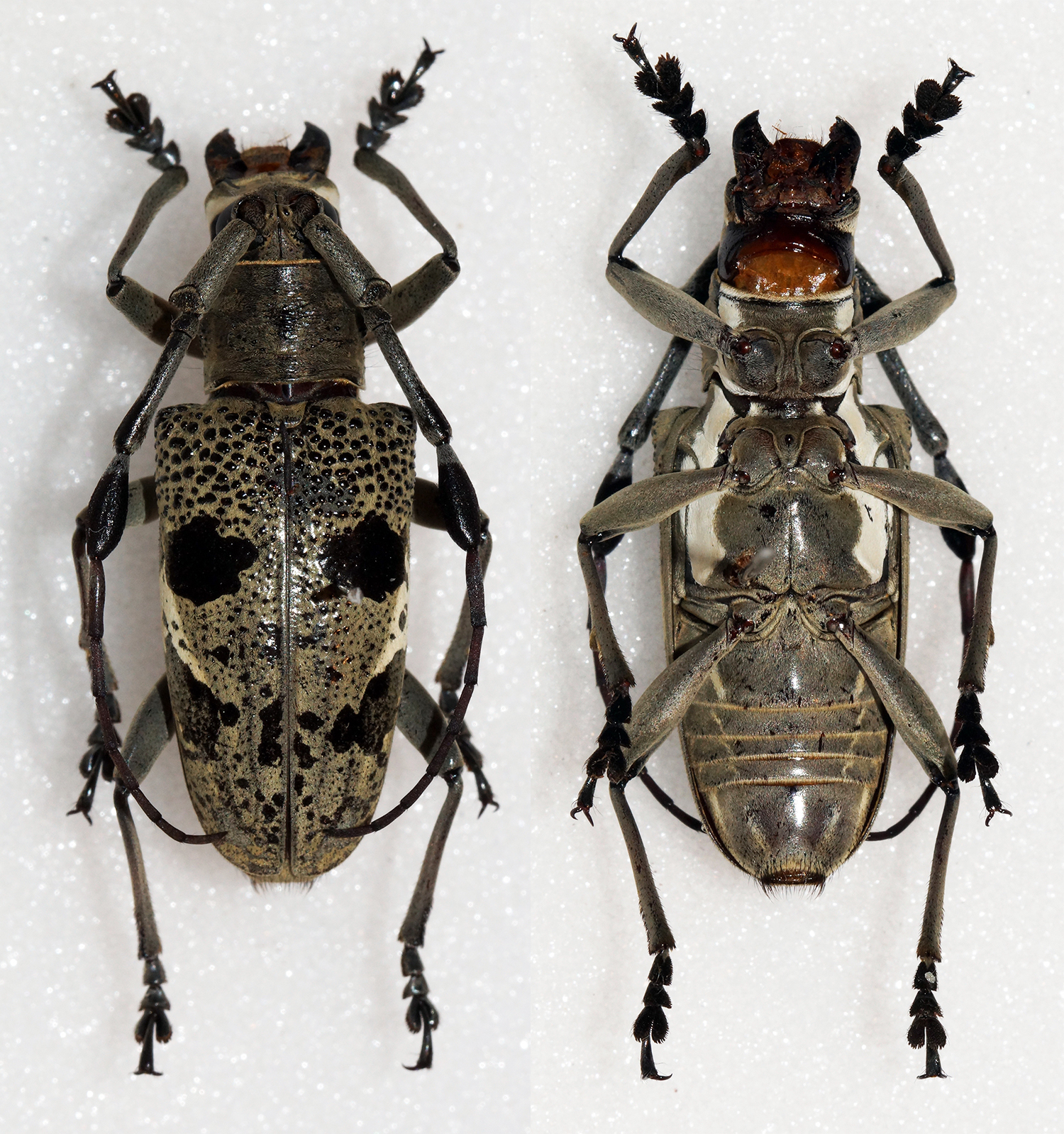
- Triammatus chevrolati

Scientific classification
- Kingdom: Animalia
- Phylum: Arthropoda
- Class: Insecta
- Order: Coleoptera
- Suborder: Polyphaga
- Infraorder: Cucujiformia
- Family: Cerambycidae
- Tribe: Lamiini
- Genus: Triammatus; Chevrolat, 1857

= Triammatus =

Genus of beetles

Triammatus is a genus of longhorn beetles of the subfamily Lamiinae, containing the following species:

- Triammatus brunneus Breuning, 1947
- Triammatus chevrolati Pascoe, 1856
- Triammatus saundersii Chevrolat, 1856
- Triammatus subinermis Breuning, 1955
- Triammatus tristis Pascoe, 1860
- Triammatus waigeuensis Gilmour, 1950
