= Crioprosopus =

Scientific classification
- Domain: Eukaryota
- Kingdom: Animalia
- Phylum: Arthropoda
- Class: Insecta
- Order: Coleoptera
- Suborder: Polyphaga
- Infraorder: Cucujiformia
- Family: Cerambycidae
- Subfamily: Cerambycinae
- Tribe: Trachyderini
- Subtribe: Trachyderina
- Genus: Crioprosopus; Audinet-Serville, 1834

Genus of beetles

Crioprosopus is a genus of long-horned beetles in the family Cerambycidae. There are about 13 described species in Crioprosopus.

The genus Callona was determined to be a synonym of Crioprosopus in 2015, and the species C. championi, C. iridescens, C. thoracicus, C. rimosus, C. thoracicus, and C. tricolor were moved from Callona to Crioprosopus.

== Species ==
These species belong to the genus Crioprosopus:

- Crioprosopus amoenus Jordan, 1895
- Crioprosopus championi Bates, 1885
- Crioprosopus chiriquiensis Eya, 2015
- Crioprosopus gaumeri Bates, 1892
- Crioprosopus hondurensis Eya, 2015
- Crioprosopus iridescens White, 1853
- Crioprosopus nieti Chevrolat, 1857
- Crioprosopus rimosus (Buquet, 1840) (beautiful mesquite borer)
- Crioprosopus saundersii White, 1853
- Crioprosopus servillei Audinet-Serville, 1834
- Crioprosopus thoracicus (White, 1853)
- Crioprosopus tricolor (Waterhouse, 1840)
- Crioprosopus wappesi Eya, 2015
