= Clinidium chandleri =

Scientific classification
- Kingdom: Animalia
- Phylum: Arthropoda
- Clade: Pancrustacea
- Class: Insecta
- Order: Coleoptera
- Suborder: Adephaga
- Family: Carabidae
- Genus: Clinidium
- Species: C. chandleri

Binomial name
- Clinidium chandleri R.T. Bell & J.R. Bell, 2009

Species of beetle

Clinidium chandleri is a species of ground beetle in the subfamily Rhysodinae. It was described by Ross Bell & J.R. Bell in 2009 and named after entomologist Donald S. Chandler. It is endemic to Costa Rica and occurs in the lowland and lower mountain forests north of the continental divide.

Clinidium chandleri measure 6–7 mm (0.24–0.28 in) in length.
