= Clinidium halffteri =

Scientific classification
- Kingdom: Animalia
- Phylum: Arthropoda
- Clade: Pancrustacea
- Class: Insecta
- Order: Coleoptera
- Suborder: Adephaga
- Family: Carabidae
- Genus: Clinidium
- Species: C. halffteri

Binomial name
- Clinidium halffteri R.T. Bell & J.R. Bell, 1985

Species of beetle

Clinidium halffteri is a species of ground beetle in the subfamily Rhysodinae. It was described by R.T. & J.R. Bell in 1985. It is named after the entomologist Gonzalo Halffter, the co-collector of the type series. The type locality is Amates in southern Veracruz, Mexico, near the Gulf of Mexico at a low elevation. Males in the type series measure 6.1–6.5 mm (0.24–0.26 in) in length.
