= Clinidium talamanca =

Scientific classification
- Kingdom: Animalia
- Phylum: Arthropoda
- Clade: Pancrustacea
- Class: Insecta
- Order: Coleoptera
- Suborder: Adephaga
- Family: Carabidae
- Genus: Clinidium
- Species: C. talamanca

Binomial name
- Clinidium talamanca R.T. Bell & J.R. Bell, 2009

Species of beetle

Clinidium talamanca is a species of ground beetle in the subfamily Rhysodinae. It was described by Ross Bell & J.R. Bell in 2009. It is endemic to the eponymous Cordillera de Talamanca in Puntarenas Province, Costa Rica.

Clinidium talamanca measure 7.5–7.8 mm (0.30–0.31 in) in length.
