= Clinidium ashei =

Scientific classification
- Kingdom: Animalia
- Phylum: Arthropoda
- Clade: Pancrustacea
- Class: Insecta
- Order: Coleoptera
- Suborder: Adephaga
- Family: Carabidae
- Genus: Clinidium
- Species: C. ashei

Binomial name
- Clinidium ashei R.T. Bell & J.R. Bell, 2009

Species of beetle

Clinidium ashei is a species of ground beetle in the subfamily Rhysodinae. It was described by Ross Bell & J.R. Bell in 2009 and named after entomologist James S. Ashe. It is endemic to the high mountains of western Panama (Chiriquí Province).

Clinidium ashei measure 7.5–8.5 mm (0.30–0.33 in) in length.
