= Clinidium brusteli =

Scientific classification
- Kingdom: Animalia
- Phylum: Arthropoda
- Clade: Pancrustacea
- Class: Insecta
- Order: Coleoptera
- Suborder: Adephaga
- Family: Carabidae
- Genus: Clinidium
- Species: C. brusteli

Binomial name
- Clinidium brusteli R.T. Bell & J.R. Bell, 2009

Species of beetle

Clinidium brusteli is a species of ground beetle in the subfamily Rhysodinae. It was described by Ross Bell & J.R. Bell in 2009 and named after entomologist Hervé Brustel. It is only known from its type locality, San Vincente de Huaticocha in Loreto Canton, eastern Ecuador.

Clinidium brusteli holotype, a male, measures 6.5 mm (0.26 in) in length.
