= Clinidium reyesi =

Scientific classification
- Kingdom: Animalia
- Phylum: Arthropoda
- Clade: Pancrustacea
- Class: Insecta
- Order: Coleoptera
- Suborder: Adephaga
- Family: Carabidae
- Genus: Clinidium
- Species: C. reyesi

Binomial name
- Clinidium reyesi R.T. Bell & J.R. Bell, 1987

Species of beetle

Clinidium reyesi is a species of ground beetle in the subfamily Rhysodinae. It was described by R.T. & J.R. Bell in 1987.
