= Clinidium integrum =

Scientific classification
- Kingdom: Animalia
- Phylum: Arthropoda
- Clade: Pancrustacea
- Class: Insecta
- Order: Coleoptera
- Suborder: Adephaga
- Family: Carabidae
- Genus: Clinidium
- Species: C. integrum

Binomial name
- Clinidium integrum Grouvelle, 1903

Species of beetle

Clinidium integrum is a species of ground beetle in the subfamily Rhysodinae. It was described by Antoine Henri Grouvelle in 1903. It is known from its type locality in western Amazonas state, Brazil, and from Leticia in Amazonas Department, Colombia.

Clinidium integrum measures 6.8 mm (0.27 in) in length.
