= Clinidium kochalkai =

Scientific classification
- Kingdom: Animalia
- Phylum: Arthropoda
- Clade: Pancrustacea
- Class: Insecta
- Order: Coleoptera
- Suborder: Adephaga
- Family: Carabidae
- Genus: Clinidium
- Species: C. kochalkai

Binomial name
- Clinidium kochalkai R.T. Bell & J.R. Bell, 1985

Species of beetle

Clinidium kochalkai is a species of ground beetle in the subfamily Rhysodinae. It was described by R.T. Bell & J.R. Bell in 1985. It is named for arachnologist John A. Kochalka, friend and former student of the Bells. Clinidium kochalkai is known from Sierra Nevada de Santa Marta, Colombia. It measures 6 mm (0.24 in) in length.
