= Clinidium pilosum =

Scientific classification
- Kingdom: Animalia
- Phylum: Arthropoda
- Clade: Pancrustacea
- Class: Insecta
- Order: Coleoptera
- Suborder: Adephaga
- Family: Carabidae
- Genus: Clinidium
- Species: C. pilosum

Binomial name
- Clinidium pilosum Grouvelle, 1903

Species of beetle

Clinidium pilosum is a species of ground beetle in the subfamily Rhysodinae. It was described by Antoine Henri Grouvelle in 1903. It is known from Mérida state in western Venezuela, possibly extending into adjacent Colombia.

Clinidium pilosum measures 6–6.8 mm (0.24–0.27 in) in length.
