= Clinidium smithsonianum =

Scientific classification
- Kingdom: Animalia
- Phylum: Arthropoda
- Clade: Pancrustacea
- Class: Insecta
- Order: Coleoptera
- Suborder: Adephaga
- Family: Carabidae
- Genus: Clinidium
- Species: C. smithsonianum

Binomial name
- Clinidium smithsonianum R.T. Bell & J.R. Bell, 1985

Species of beetle

Clinidium smithsonianum is a species of ground beetle in the subfamily Rhysodinae. It was described by R.T. Bell & J.R. Bell in 1985. Clinidium smithsonianum is known from Dominica (Lesser Antilles). It measures 5–6.1 mm (0.20–0.24 in) in length.
