= Ischnolea longeantennata =

Scientific classification
- Kingdom: Animalia
- Phylum: Arthropoda
- Class: Insecta
- Order: Coleoptera
- Suborder: Polyphaga
- Infraorder: Cucujiformia
- Family: Cerambycidae
- Genus: Ischnolea
- Species: I. longeantennata

Binomial name
- Ischnolea longeantennata Breuning, 1942

Species of beetle

Ischnolea longeantennata is a species of beetle in the family Cerambycidae. It was described by Stephan von Breuning in 1942. It is known from Brazil.
