= Atelodesmis knabi =

Scientific classification
- Domain: Eukaryota
- Kingdom: Animalia
- Phylum: Arthropoda
- Class: Insecta
- Order: Coleoptera
- Suborder: Polyphaga
- Infraorder: Cucujiformia
- Family: Cerambycidae
- Genus: Atelodesmis
- Species: A. knabi

Binomial name
- Atelodesmis knabi (Fisher, 1925)

Synonyms
- Eupogonius knabi Fisher, 1925

Species of beetle

Atelodesmis knabi is a species of beetle in the family Cerambycidae. It was described by Fisher in 1925. It is known from Mexico.
