= Clinidium erwini =

Scientific classification
- Kingdom: Animalia
- Phylum: Arthropoda
- Clade: Pancrustacea
- Class: Insecta
- Order: Coleoptera
- Suborder: Adephaga
- Family: Carabidae
- Genus: Clinidium
- Species: C. erwini

Binomial name
- Clinidium erwini R.T. Bell & J.R. Bell, 2009

Species of beetle

Clinidium erwini is a species of ground beetle in the subfamily Rhysodinae. It was described by Ross Bell & J.R. Bell in 2009 and named after entomologist Terry Erwin. It is endemic to Costa Rica and occurs in the forests of the Caribbean coast and inland to at least 400 m (1,300 ft) above sea level.

Clinidium erwini males measure 4.0–5.5 mm (0.16–0.22 in) and females 4.8–6.0 mm (0.19–0.24 in) in length.
