= Clinidium howdenorum =

Scientific classification
- Kingdom: Animalia
- Phylum: Arthropoda
- Clade: Pancrustacea
- Class: Insecta
- Order: Coleoptera
- Suborder: Adephaga
- Family: Carabidae
- Genus: Clinidium
- Species: C. howdenorum

Binomial name
- Clinidium howdenorum R.T. Bell & J.R. Bell, 1985

Species of beetle

Clinidium howdenorum is a species of ground beetle in the subfamily Rhysodinae. It was described by R.T. & J.R. Bell in 1985. It is named after Anne and Henry Howden, the collectors of the type series. It is known from Morne Bleu, Trinidad, at 820 m (2,700 ft) above sea level. The holotype measures 6 mm (0.24 in) in length.
