= Clinidium valentinei =

Scientific classification
- Kingdom: Animalia
- Phylum: Arthropoda
- Clade: Pancrustacea
- Class: Insecta
- Order: Coleoptera
- Suborder: Adephaga
- Family: Carabidae
- Subfamily: Rhysodinae
- Genus: Clinidium
- Species: C. valentinei

Binomial name
- Clinidium valentinei R.T. Bell, 1970

Species of beetle

Clinidium valentinei is a species of ground beetle in the subfamily Rhysodinae. It was described by R.T. Bell in 1970. It is endemic to the Appalachian Mountains in the eastern United States, from northern Alabama to southwestern Pennsylvania.

Clinidium valentinei measure 5.4–6.4 mm (0.21–0.25 in) in length.
