= Crioprosopus gaumeri =

Scientific classification
- Domain: Eukaryota
- Kingdom: Animalia
- Phylum: Arthropoda
- Class: Insecta
- Order: Coleoptera
- Suborder: Polyphaga
- Infraorder: Cucujiformia
- Family: Cerambycidae
- Genus: Crioprosopus
- Species: C. gaumeri

Binomial name
- Crioprosopus gaumeri Bates, 1892

Species of beetle

Crioprosopus gaumeri is a species of beetle in the family Cerambycidae. It was described by Bates in 1892.
