= Clinidium calcaratum =

Scientific classification
- Kingdom: Animalia
- Phylum: Arthropoda
- Clade: Pancrustacea
- Class: Insecta
- Order: Coleoptera
- Suborder: Adephaga
- Family: Carabidae
- Subfamily: Rhysodinae
- Genus: Clinidium
- Species: C. calcaratum

Binomial name
- Clinidium calcaratum LeConte, 1875

Species of beetle

Clinidium calcaratum is a species of ground beetle in the subfamily Rhysodinae. It was described by John Lawrence LeConte in 1875. It is known from the western North America between California and British Columbia.

Clinidium calcaratum measure 5.8–8.1 mm (0.23–0.32 in) in length.
