= Clinidium alleni =

Scientific classification
- Kingdom: Animalia
- Phylum: Arthropoda
- Clade: Pancrustacea
- Class: Insecta
- Order: Coleoptera
- Suborder: Adephaga
- Family: Carabidae
- Genus: Clinidium
- Species: C. alleni

Binomial name
- Clinidium alleni R.T. Bell & J.R. Bell, 1985

Species of beetle

Clinidium alleni is a species of ground beetle in the subfamily Rhysodinae. It was described by R.T. & J.R. Bell in 1985. It is named for R. T. Allen, whose collection efforts have contributed to the understanding of beetle fauna in lower Central America. It is known from Cerro Jefe in Panama. The holotype is a male measuring 4 mm (0.16 in) in length.
