= Clinidium beccarii =

Scientific classification
- Kingdom: Animalia
- Phylum: Arthropoda
- Clade: Pancrustacea
- Class: Insecta
- Order: Coleoptera
- Suborder: Adephaga
- Family: Carabidae
- Genus: Clinidium
- Species: C. beccarii

Binomial name
- Clinidium beccarii Grouvelle, 1903

Synonyms
- Rhyzodiastes beccarii (Grouvelle, 1903)

Species of beetle

Clinidium beccarii is a species of ground beetle in the subfamily Rhysodinae. It was described by Antoine Henri Grouvelle in 1903. It is known from Hatam, New Guinea. It is named after the collector of the holotype, Odoardo Beccari. The holotype is a male measuring 8 mm (0.31 in) in length.
