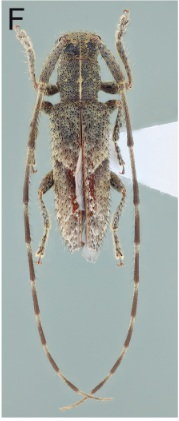

Scientific classification
- Kingdom: Animalia
- Phylum: Arthropoda
- Clade: Pancrustacea
- Class: Insecta
- Order: Coleoptera
- Suborder: Polyphaga
- Infraorder: Cucujiformia
- Family: Cerambycidae
- Genus: Ischnolea
- Species: I. modesta

Binomial name
- Ischnolea modesta Galileo & Martins, 1993

= Ischnolea modesta =

Species of beetle

Ischnolea modesta is a species of beetle in the family Cerambycidae. It was described by Galileo and Martins in 1993. It is known from Brazil, Bolivia and Paraguay.
