= Clinidium validum =

Scientific classification
- Kingdom: Animalia
- Phylum: Arthropoda
- Clade: Pancrustacea
- Class: Insecta
- Order: Coleoptera
- Suborder: Adephaga
- Family: Carabidae
- Genus: Clinidium
- Species: C. validum

Binomial name
- Clinidium validum Grouvelle, 1903

Species of beetle

Clinidium validum is a species of ground beetle in the subfamily Rhysodinae. It was described by Antoine Henri Grouvelle in 1903. It is widespread in the Amazon Basin of Brazil with records from Amazonas, Pará, and Amapá states. Clinidium validum measure 5.8–6.4 mm (0.23–0.25 in) in length.
