= Clinidium guatemalenum =

Scientific classification
- Kingdom: Animalia
- Phylum: Arthropoda
- Clade: Pancrustacea
- Class: Insecta
- Order: Coleoptera
- Suborder: Adephaga
- Family: Carabidae
- Genus: Clinidium
- Species: C. guatemalenum

Binomial name
- Clinidium guatemalenum Sharp, 1899

Species of beetle

Clinidium guatemalenum is a species of ground beetle in the subfamily Rhysodinae. It was described by David Sharp in 1899. It is endemic to Guatemala.

Clinidium guatemalenum measure 7–7.7 mm (0.28–0.30 in) in length.
