= Clinidium penicillatum =

Scientific classification
- Kingdom: Animalia
- Phylum: Arthropoda
- Clade: Pancrustacea
- Class: Insecta
- Order: Coleoptera
- Suborder: Adephaga
- Family: Carabidae
- Genus: Clinidium
- Species: C. penicillatum

Binomial name
- Clinidium penicillatum R.T. Bell & J.R. Bell, 1985

Species of beetle

Clinidium penicillatum is a species of ground beetle in the subfamily Rhysodinae. It was described by R.T. Bell & J.R. Bell in 1985. It is known from below the Calima Lake in Valle del Cauca Department, Colombia. The holotype is a female measuring 6 mm (0.24 in) in length.
