= Clinidium blomi =

Scientific classification
- Kingdom: Animalia
- Phylum: Arthropoda
- Clade: Pancrustacea
- Class: Insecta
- Order: Coleoptera
- Suborder: Adephaga
- Family: Carabidae
- Genus: Clinidium
- Species: C. blomi

Binomial name
- Clinidium blomi R.T. Bell, 1970

Species of beetle

Clinidium blomi is a species of ground beetle in the subfamily Rhysodinae. It was described by R.T. Bell in 1970. It is endemic to the High Plateau of Chiapas in southeastern Mexico.

Clinidium blomi measure 6.1–7.5 mm (0.24–0.30 in) in length.
