= Clinidium chiolinoi =

Scientific classification
- Kingdom: Animalia
- Phylum: Arthropoda
- Clade: Pancrustacea
- Class: Insecta
- Order: Coleoptera
- Suborder: Adephaga
- Family: Carabidae
- Genus: Clinidium
- Species: C. chiolinoi

Binomial name
- Clinidium chiolinoi R.T. Bell, 1970

Species of beetle

Clinidium chiolinoi is a species of ground beetle in the subfamily Rhysodinae. It was described by R.T. Bell in 1970. It is endemic to Jamaica. Clinidium chiolinoi measure 4.4–5.6 mm (0.17–0.22 in) in length.
