= Clinidium sulcigaster =

Scientific classification
- Kingdom: Animalia
- Phylum: Arthropoda
- Clade: Pancrustacea
- Class: Insecta
- Order: Coleoptera
- Suborder: Adephaga
- Family: Carabidae
- Genus: Clinidium
- Species: C. sulcigaster

Binomial name
- Clinidium sulcigaster R.T. Bell, 1970

Species of beetle

Clinidium sulcigaster is a species of ground beetle in the subfamily Rhysodinae. It was described by Ross T. Bell in 1970. It is known from near Lake Atitlán in Guatemala. The holotype is a male measuring 5.5 mm (0.22 in) in length.
