= Clinidium canaliculatum =

Conservation status
- Vulnerable (IUCN 3.1)

Scientific classification
- Kingdom: Animalia
- Phylum: Arthropoda
- Clade: Pancrustacea
- Class: Insecta
- Order: Coleoptera
- Suborder: Adephaga
- Family: Carabidae
- Genus: Clinidium
- Subgenus: Clinidium (Arctoclinidium)
- Species: C. canaliculatum

Binomial name
- Clinidium canaliculatum (O.G. Costa, 1839)

Synonyms
- Ips canaliculatum O.G. Costa, 1839; Rhysodes trisulcatum Germar, 1840; Rhysodes sulcipennis Mulsant, 1853; Clinidium (Arctoclinidium) sulcipennis (Mulsant, 1853); Clinidium (Arctoclinidium) trisulcatum (Germar, 1840)

Species of beetle

Clinidium canaliculatum is a species of ground beetle in the subfamily Rhysodinae. It was described by O.G. Costa in 1839. It is found in southern Italy (including Sicily) and in Greece. It is an obligate saproxylic species associated with old-growth forests, with preference to wet biotopes with well-decayed wood. Clinidium canaliculatum measure 6–7.5 mm (0.24–0.30 in) in length.
