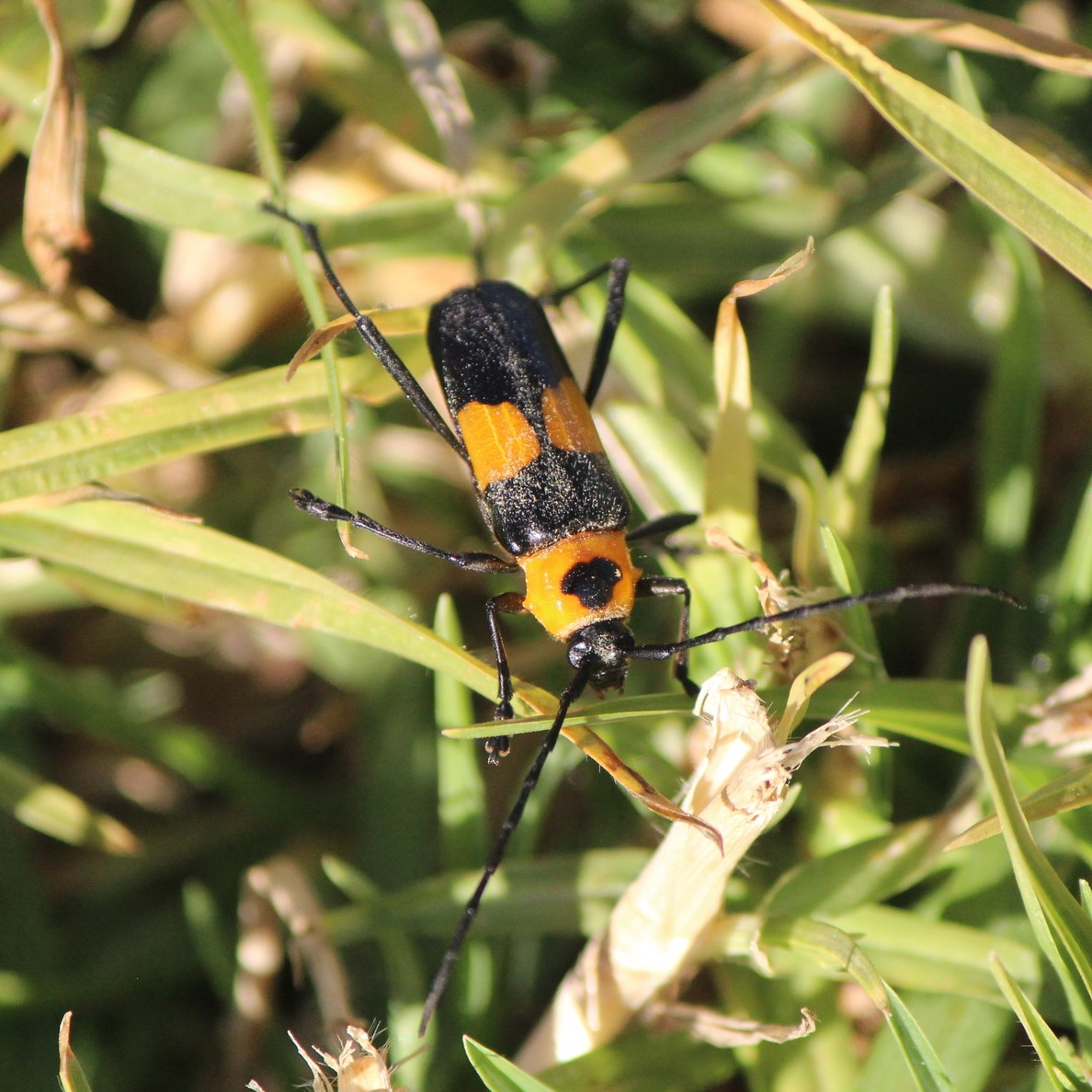

Scientific classification
- Kingdom: Animalia
- Phylum: Arthropoda
- Class: Insecta
- Order: Coleoptera
- Suborder: Polyphaga
- Infraorder: Cucujiformia
- Family: Cerambycidae
- Genus: Gambria
- Species: G. leucozona

Binomial name
- Gambria leucozona Bates, 1880

= Gambria leucozona =

Species of beetle

Gambria leucozona is a species of beetle in the family Cerambycidae. It was first described by Henry Walter Bates in 1880.
