= Clinidium apertum =

Scientific classification
- Kingdom: Animalia
- Phylum: Arthropoda
- Clade: Pancrustacea
- Class: Insecta
- Order: Coleoptera
- Suborder: Adephaga
- Family: Carabidae
- Genus: Clinidium
- Species: C. apertum

Binomial name
- Clinidium apertum Reitter, 1880

Species of beetle

Clinidium apertum is a species of ground beetle in the subfamily Rhysodinae. It was described by Edmund Reitter in 1880. It is endemic to the eastern United States.

Clinidium apertum measure 5.5–7 mm (0.22–0.28 in) in length.
