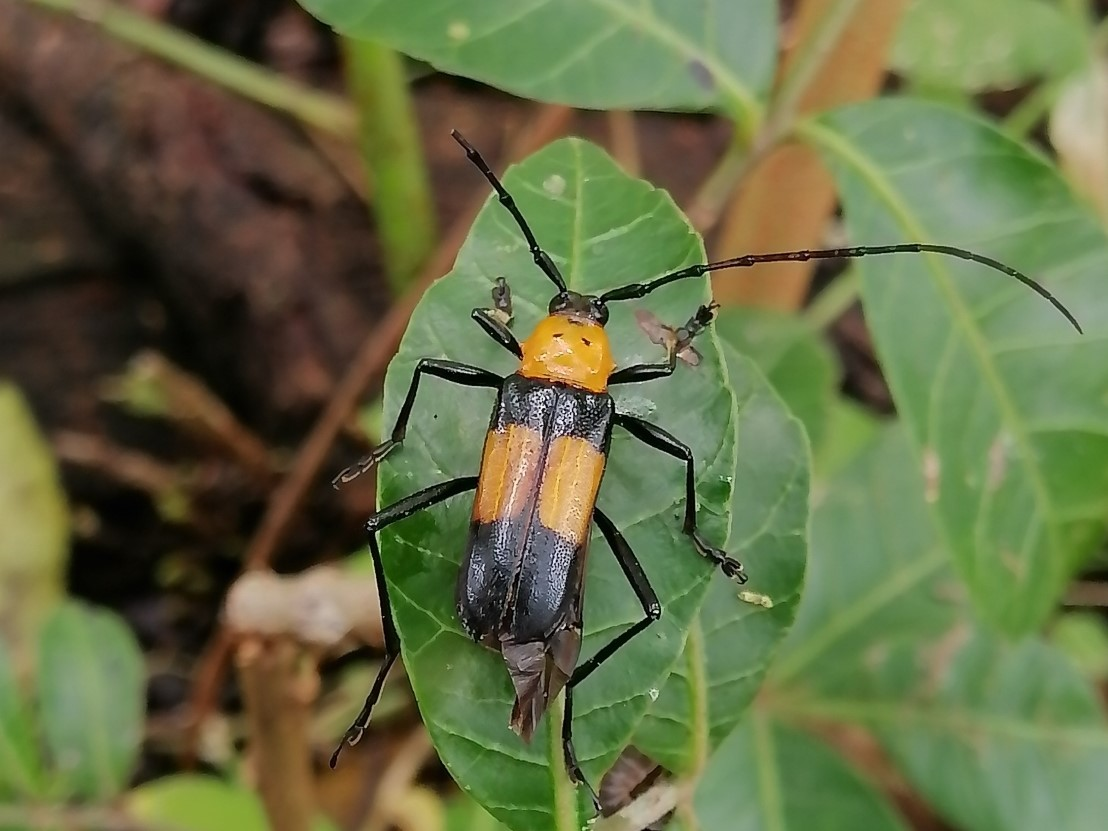
- Gambria bicolor

Scientific classification
- Kingdom: Animalia
- Phylum: Arthropoda
- Class: Insecta
- Order: Coleoptera
- Suborder: Polyphaga
- Infraorder: Cucujiformia
- Family: Cerambycidae
- Subfamily: Cerambycinae
- Tribe: Trachyderini
- Genus: Gambria; Chevrolat, 1862

= Gambria =

Genus of beetles

Gambria is a genus of beetles in the family Cerambycidae, containing the following species:

- Gambria bicolor (Chevrolat, 1862)
- Gambria leucozona Bates, 1880
- Gambria nigripennis (Chevrolat, 1862)
