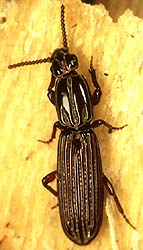

Scientific classification
- Kingdom: Animalia
- Phylum: Arthropoda
- Clade: Pancrustacea
- Class: Insecta
- Order: Coleoptera
- Suborder: Adephaga
- Family: Carabidae
- Subfamily: Rhysodinae
- Genus: Clinidium
- Species: C. baldufi

Binomial name
- Clinidium baldufi R.T. Bell, 1970

= Clinidium baldufi =

Species of beetle

Clinidium baldufi is a species of ground beetle in the subfamily Rhysodinae. It was described by Ross Bell in 1970. It is endemic to the central and eastern United States, east of central Iowa, southeastern Missouri and southwestern Mississippi, as far south as northern Florida, and north to northern Illinois, Pennsylvania, and New Jersey.

Clinidium baldufi measure 5.9–7.4 mm (0.23–0.29 in) in length.
