= Donald S. Chandler =

American entomologist

Donald S. Chandler is an entomologist working at the Department of Zoology, University of New Hampshire, Durham, New Hampshire.

Beetle Clinidium chandleri is named after him.
