= Louis Alexandre Auguste Chevrolat =

French entomologist (1799–1884)

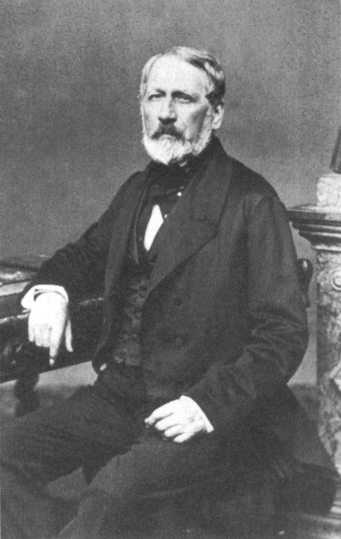
- Born: 29 March 1799; Paris
- Died: 16 December 1884 (aged 85); Paris
- Occupation: entomologist

Louis Alexandre Auguste Chevrolat (French pronunciation: [lwi alɛksɑ̃dʁ oɡyst ʃəvʁɔla]; 29 March 1799, Paris – 16 December 1884, Paris) was a French entomologist. He specialized mainly on the beetles and was a founder of the Societe entomologique de France in 1832.

Chevrolat worked as a toll administrator in government service in Paris. He was an amateur entomologist who studied mainly beetles and birds. He published nearly 250 notes and papers and was the author of more than 2,000 species. He was one of the founders of the Société entomologique de France in 1832. On his death, his collection was dispersed. Part of his collection is now in the Natural History Museum in London along with some manuscripts.

== Works ==
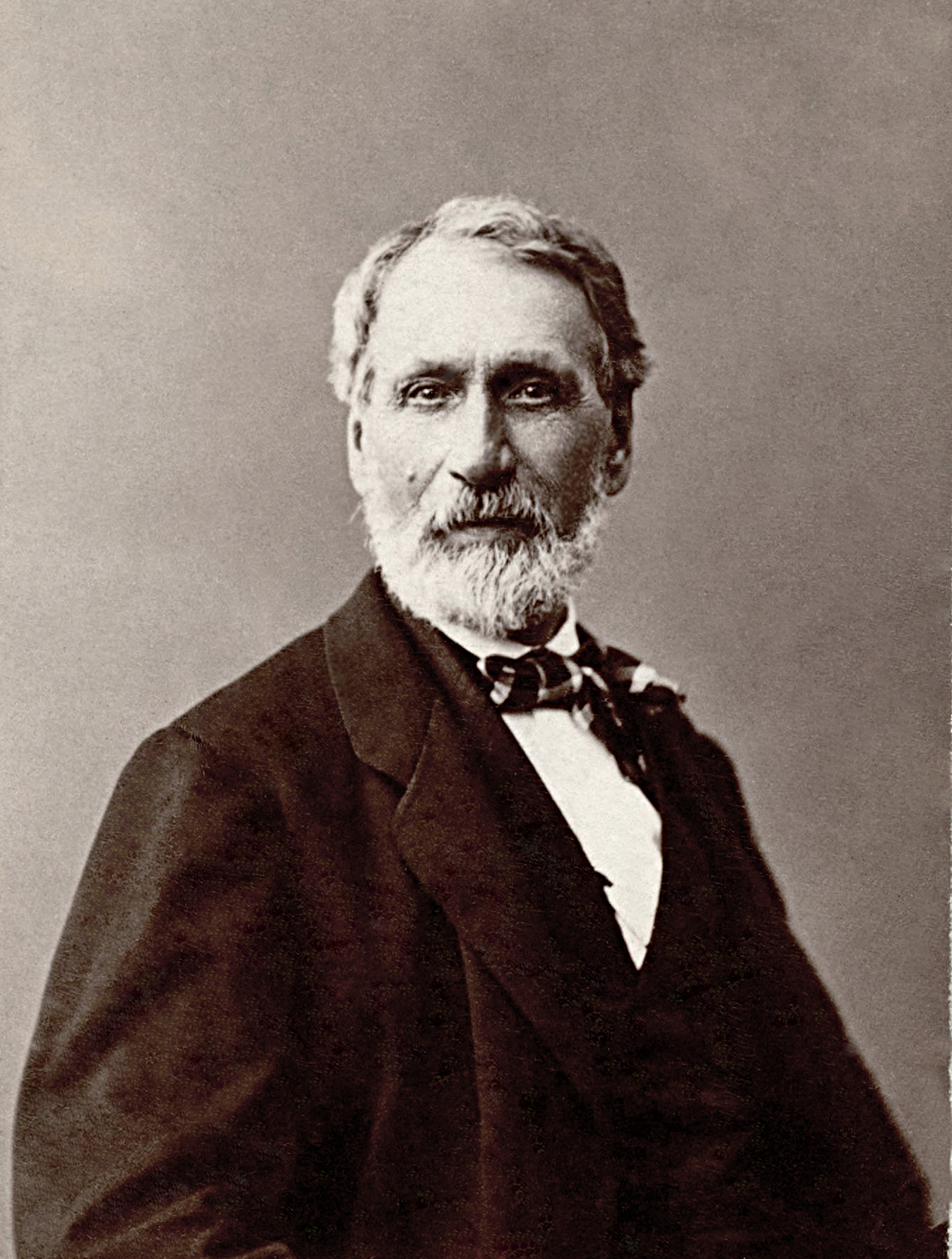

(Selection)

- 1833a. Description de Buprestis analis. Magasin de Zoologie 1833. Insectes, Nr. 60, 1 color plate.
- 1833b. Coléoptères du Mexique, Fascicle 1, [25 pp.], Oct. 1833. Strasbourg.
- 1834. Coléoptères du Mexique, Fascicle 2, [50 pp.], Mar. 1834; Fascicle 3, [48 pp.], Nov. 1834. Strasbourg.
- 1835. Coléoptères du Mexique, Fascicle 4, [70 pp.], Jan. 1835; Fascicle 5, [48 pp.], Jan. 1835; Fascicle 6, [48 pp.], June 1835; Fascicle 7, [46 pp.], July 1835. Fascicle 8, [68 pp.], Sept. 1835. Strasbourg.
- 1838a. Centurie de Buprestides. Revue Entomologique 5:41-110.
- 1838b. Description de trois Buprestis et d'un superbe Cyphus nouveau. Revue Zoologique par la Société Cuvierienne 1838, pp. 55–56.
- 1838c. Insectes Coléoptères inédits, découverts par M. Lanier dans l'intérieur de l'île de Cuba. Revue Zoologique par la Société Cuvierienne, pp. 279–286.
- 1841. Description de trente quatre espèces de Coléoptères de Manille et d'un Tricondyle de Ceylan. Revue Zoologique par la Société Cuvierienne 1841, pp. 221–228.
- 1843. Description d'une nouvelle espèce de Buprestide. Revue Zoologique par la Société Cuvierienne 1843, p. 201.
- 1844a. Note rectificative de quelques espèces de la famille des Sternoxes (Buprestides), et description d'une nouvelle espèce d'Anthonomus, découverte aux environs de Paris. Revue Zoologique par la Société Cuvierienne, 1844, pp. 134–144.
- 1844b. Mélanges et nouvelles. Revue Zoologique par la Société Cuvierienne, 1844:239-240.
- 1853. Description d'une nouvelle espèces de Buprestide. Revue et Magasin de Zoologie (2) 5:308-309.
- 1854a. Coléoptères de Syrie. Revue et Magasin de Zoologie (2) 6, pp. 389–396, 432-437, 479-486.
- 1854b. Une note synonymique. Revue et Magasin de Zoologie (2) 6:701.
- 1859. Descriptions de dix Coléoptères nouveaux de l'Algérie. Revue et Magasin de Zoologie (2) 11:380-390.
- 1860a. Descriptions de Coléoptères nouveaux de l'Algérie. Revue et Magasin de Zoologie (2) 12, pp. 75–82, 128-137, 208-212, 269-271, 302-304, 409-410, 448-459, 509-511.
- 1860b. Description d'Espèces de Clytus propres au Mexique. Annales de la Société entomologique de France (3) 8:451-504.
- 1861a. Descriptions de Coléoptères nouveaux de l'Algérie. Revue et Magasin de Zoologie (2) 13, pp. 118–126, 147-155, 205-208, 264-270, 306-312.
- 1861b. Description des Clytides de l'ancienne Colombie. Annales de la Société entomologique de France (4) 1:377-388.
- 1862a. Description des Clytides du Brésil. Annales de la Société entomologique de France (4) 2:49-67.
- 1862b. Coléoptères de l'Ile de Cuba. Notes, synonymies et descriptions d'espèces nouvelles. (Famille des Cérambycides et des Parandrides). Annales de la Société entomologique de France (4) 2:245-280.
- 1862c. Description des Clytides Américains. Annales de la Société entomologique de France (4) 2:517-536.
- 1863a. Clytides d'Asie et d'Océanie. Mémoires de la Société Royale des Sciences de Liège 18:253-350.
- 1863b. Coléoptères de l'Ile de Cuba. Notes, synonymies et descriptions d'espèces nouvelles. (Famille des Cicindélètes, Carabiques, Dytiscides, Gyrinides et Palpicornes). Annales de la Société entomologique de France (4) 3:183-210.
- 1863c. Coléoptères de l'Ile de Cuba. Notes, synonymies et descriptions d'espèces nouvelles. (Famille des Staphyliniens). Annales de la Société entomologique de France (4) 3:427-446.
- 1863d. Coléoptères de l'Ile de Cuba. Notes, synonymies et descriptions d'espèces nouvelles. (Famille des Histériens, Phalacrides, Nitidulaires, Trogositaires. Colydiens, Rhyzodides, Cucujipes, Mycétophagides, Dermestins, Byrrhiens Et Chélonariides). Annales de la Société entomologique de France (4) 3:589-620.
- 1864a. Coléoptères de l'Ile de Cuba. Notes, synonymies et descriptions d'espèces nouvelles. (Famille des Parnides, Hétérocérides, Passalides et Lamellicornes (Tribus des Coprides, Aphodiides, Hybosorides, Géotrupides et Trogides)). Annales de la Société entomologique de France (4) 4:405-418.
- 1864b. Description d'un nouveau genre et diverses espèces d'insectes coléoptères de 1'île de Cuba. Revue et Magasin de Zoologie (2) 16:179-182.
- 1865a. Coléoptères de l'Ile de Cuba. Notes, synonymies et descriptions d'espèces nouvelles. (Famille des Lamellicornes (tribus des Mélolonthides, Rutélides, Dynastides et Cétonides)). Annales de la Société entomologique de France (4) 5:21-36.
- 1865b. Descriptions de Coléoptères d'Espagne, nouveaux ou peu connus. Revue et magasin de zoologie (2) 7:347-352.; 390-397.; 18:24-29.; 100-108.; 321-326.
- 1867. Coléoptères de l'île de Cuba. (Suite) Notes, synonymies et descriptions d'espèces nouvelles. Septième mémoire. Famille des Buprestides, Throscides, Eucnémides et Élaterides. Annales de la Société Entomologique de France (4) 7:571-616.
