= Beyond Silent Spring =

1996 book on environmentalism

Beyond Silent Spring: Integrated Pest Management and Chemical Safety
- Editor: Helmut Fritz van Emden, David Peakall
- Language: English
- Genre: Non-fiction
- Publisher: Springer
- Publication date: 1996
- ISBN: 9780412728006

Beyond Silent Spring: Integrated Pest Management and Chemical Safety is a 1996 book about environmentalism edited by Helmut Fritz van Emden and David Peakall. It is a follow-up to the influential 1962 book Silent Spring.
