= Liberty Institute (Brazil) =

Brazilian independent think tank

Instituto Liberdade do Rio Grande do Sul is a Brazilian independent think tank, formed by intellectual entrepreneurs, based in Porto Alegre. Instituto Liberdade is not endowed and does not accept government funding. All of its programs depend upon the generosity of foundations, individuals, and corporations that share belief in the importance of independent research.

Instituto Liberdade is among the Top 40 think tanks in Latin America and the Caribbean, from the 2009 Global Go To Think Tanks Index, research conducted by the University of Pennsylvania – Think Tanks and Civil Societies Program.

Three members of its board of directors are also members of the Mont Pelerin Society.

== Objectives ==
The objectives of the Institute include conducting research on public policies issues in order to influence government policy makers, debating within and among other free market think tanks, and creating awareness in the general public and academics on the benefit of adopting free market values, respect to private property rights, contracts, rule of law, and support for limited government.

== Major public policy issues ==
- Culture/Humanities
- Agriculture
- Democratic Institutions/Elections
- Privatization/Deregulation
- Religion/Philosophy
- Government
- Labor
- Terrorism/Drugs
- Fiscal Policy/Taxation
- Environment
- National Security/Alliance Relations
- Economics of Development
- Healthcare
- International Trade and Financial Institutions
- Justice/Crime
- Education
- Environment/Climate Change/Energy
- International Relations/Organizations
- Military/Defense Policy

== Publications and activities ==
It has published books translated to Portuguese, such as Beyond Politics, The Ethics of Redistribution, Free Market Environmentalism, The Adventures of Jonathan Gullible, What has government done to our money?, Trashing the Planet, Progressive Environmentalism.

It has published articles and collaborated with other think tanks in reports and studies, such as Civil Society Report on Intellectual Property, Innovation and Health from International Policy Network; Free Trade in the Americas from International Policy Network; International Property Rights Index 2007, 2008, 2009 from Property Rights Alliance; Atlas Economic Research Foundation; Friedrich Naumann Foundation; Competitive Enterprise Institute; Montreal Economic Institute; Instituto de Estudos Empresariais; Institute of Economic Affairs; Inter-American Policy Exchange at Manhattan Institute for Policy Research.

Since 1988, Instituto Liberdade has been a partner of Instituto de Estudos Empresariais – IEE – for the annual international event Fórum da Liberdade (Liberty Forum). The Liberty Forum is one of the most significant meetings of liberal thought in the world, which takes place at the city of Porto Alegre, in Brazil.

In 2004, Instituto Liberdade joined Liberal Network for Latin America – RELIAL, a network of think tanks and parties involved in research on public policies, which represents, divulges and implements ideas of classic liberalism, standing its ground in Latin America.

In March 2006, Instituto Liberdade joined with other 16 global think tanks to publish a report on Intellectual Property, Innovation and Health, organized by International Policy Network.

In April 2006, Instituto Liberdade was the recipient of the 2006 Templeton Freedom Award Grant from Atlas Economic Research Foundation. As a winner, the institute represents a strong role model for other think tanks in the international network with which Atlas works. The Templeton Freedom Awards Presentation took place at Colorado Springs, USA on April 22, 2006.

In February 2007, Instituto Liberdade joined with other 25 global think tanks to form a global coalition called the Civil Society Coalition on Climate Change that seeks to educate the public about climate change issues in an impartial manner. This coalition is organized by International Policy Network.

Instituto Liberdade joined with other global think tanks to launch in Brazil, the International Property Rights Index 2007, 2008, 2009, 2010 and 2011 editions (IPRI), organized by Property Rights Alliance. The materials were translated to Portuguese and it is available to download @ Instituto Liberdade's portal. It provides a tool for comparative analysis and future research on global property rights.

In April 2007, Instituto Liberdade joined the Save The Tiger Initiative Project from the Sustainable Development Network, along with other 35 more global think tanks, supporting a free-market solution for the conservation of wildlife.

Instituto Liberdade, in partnership with The Heritage Foundation and sponsorship of Instituto de Estudos Empresariais, organized the launch of the Index of Economic Freedom in Brazil from 2009 to 2013. The material was translated to Portuguese and it is available to download @ Instituto Liberdade's portal.

In July 2007, Instituto Liberdade and other 25 members of the Sustainable Development Network supported the publication of the report called “Too Many People?” from Prof. Nicholas Eberstadt, who challenged many widely held myths about population growth and human development.

Instituto Liberdade was a co-sponsor of the International Conference on Climate Change at the 2008, 2009, 2010 and 2011 editions, organized by The Heartland Institute.

In 2009, Instituto Liberdade joined the Freedom to Trade Coalition Neue Domain bei der webgo GmbH, an initiative from International Policy Network and Atlas Economic Research Foundation. It was a campaign to alert the public to the looming dangers of protectionism and to oppose existing and new protectionist measures.

Since 2004, Instituto Liberdade has been promoting the Tax Freedom Day in Brazil, creating public awareness of the hidden taxes on products and services. The campaign is the sale of gasoline without taxes in partnership with the owner of a gas station, the Association of the Middle Class (ACLAME) and Instituto de Estudos Empresariais (IEE).

== See also ==
- Acton Institute
- Fraser Institute
