= Silent Spring =

Book by Rachel Carson about pesticides harming the environment

- Cover of the first edition
- Author: Rachel Carson
- Language: English
- Subjects: Pesticides; ecology; environmentalism
- Published: September 27, 1962 (Houghton Mifflin)
- Publication place: United States
- Media type: Print (hardcover · paperback)

Silent Spring is an environmental science book by Rachel Carson. Published on September 27, 1962, the book documented the environmental harm caused by the indiscriminate use of DDT, a pesticide used by soldiers during World War II. Carson accused the chemical industry of spreading disinformation and public officials of accepting the industry's marketing claims unquestioningly.

In the late 1950s, Carson began to work on environmental conservation, especially environmental problems that she correctly believed were caused by synthetic pesticides. The result of her research was Silent Spring, which brought environmental concerns to the American public. The book was met with fierce opposition by chemical companies, but it swayed public opinion and led to a reversal in US pesticide policy, a nationwide ban on DDT for agricultural uses, and an environmental movement that led to the creation of the US Environmental Protection Agency.

In 2006, Silent Spring was named one of the 25 greatest science books of all time by the editors of Discover magazine and is widely considered a forerunner text for modern environmentalism.

== Research and writing ==
In the mid-1940s, Carson became concerned about the use of synthetic pesticides, many of which had been developed through the military funding of science after World War II. The United States Department of Agriculture's 1957 fire ant eradication program, which involved aerial spraying of DDT and other pesticides mixed with fuel oil and included the spraying of private land, prompted Carson to devote her research, and her next book, to pesticides and environmental poisons. Landowners in Long Island filed a suit to have the spraying stopped, and many in affected regions followed the case closely. Though the suit was lost, the Supreme Court granted petitioners the right to gain injunctions against potential environmental damage in the future, laying the basis for later environmental actions.

The impetus for Silent Spring was a letter written in January 1958 by Carson's friend, Olga Owens Huckins, to The Boston Herald, describing the death of birds around her property in Duxbury, Massachusetts, resulting from the aerial spraying of DDT to kill mosquitoes, a copy of which Huckins sent to Carson. Carson later wrote that this letter prompted her to study the environmental problems caused by the overuse of chemical pesticides.

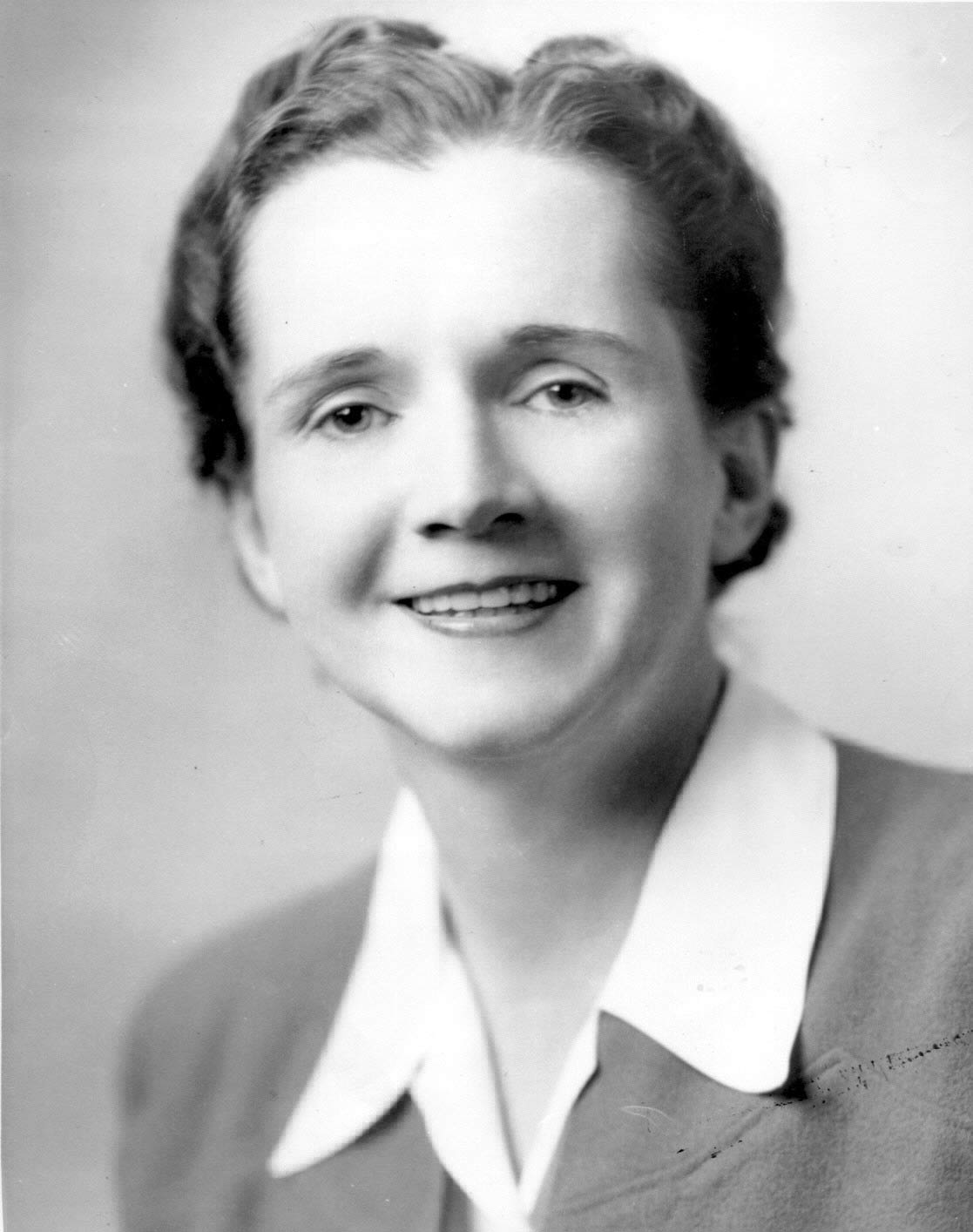
Rachel Carson, 1940 Fish and Wildlife Service employee photo

The Audubon Naturalist Society actively opposed chemical spraying programs and recruited Carson to help publicize the US government's spraying practices and related research. Carson began the four-year project of Silent Spring by gathering examples of environmental damage attributed to DDT. She tried to enlist essayist E. B. White and a number of journalists and scientists to her cause. By 1958, Carson had arranged a book deal, with plans to co-write with Newsweek science journalist Edwin Diamond. However, when The New Yorker commissioned a long and well-paid article on the topic from Carson, she began considering writing more than the introduction and conclusion as planned; soon it became a solo project. Diamond would later write one of the harshest critiques of Silent Spring.

As her research progressed, Carson found a sizable community of scientists who were documenting the physiological and environmental effects of pesticides. She took advantage of her personal connections with many government scientists, who supplied her with confidential information on the subject. From reading the scientific literature and interviewing scientists, Carson found two scientific camps: those who dismissed the possible danger of pesticide spraying barring conclusive proof, and those who were open to the possibility of harm and willing to consider alternative methods, such as biological pest control.

Fire Ants on Trial – public service film produced by the USDA

By 1959, the USDA's Agricultural Research Service responded to the criticism by Carson and others with a public service film, Fire Ants on Trial; Carson called it "flagrant propaganda" that ignored the dangers that spraying pesticides posed to humans and wildlife. That spring, Carson wrote a letter, published in The Washington Post, that attributed the recent decline in bird populations—in her words, the "silencing of birds"—to pesticide overuse. The same year, the 1957, 1958, and 1959 crops of US cranberries were found to contain high levels of the herbicide aminotriazole and the sale of all cranberry products was halted. Carson attended the ensuing FDA hearings on revising pesticide regulations; she was discouraged by the aggressive tactics of the chemical industry representatives, which included expert testimony that was firmly contradicted by the bulk of the scientific literature she had been studying. She also wondered about the possible "financial inducements behind certain pesticide programs".

Research at the National Library of Medicine of the National Institutes of Health brought Carson into contact with medical researchers investigating the gamut of cancer-causing chemicals. Of particular significance was the work of National Cancer Institute researcher and founding director of the environmental cancer section Wilhelm Hueper, who classified many pesticides as carcinogens. Carson and her research assistant Jeanne Davis, with the help of NIH librarian Dorothy Algire, found evidence to support the pesticide-cancer connection; to Carson the evidence for the toxicity of a wide array of synthetic pesticides was clear-cut, though such conclusions were very controversial beyond the small community of scientists studying pesticide carcinogenesis.

By 1960, Carson had sufficient research material and the writing was progressing rapidly. She had investigated hundreds of individual incidents of pesticide exposure and the resulting human sickness and ecological damage. In January 1960, she suffered an illness which kept her bedridden for weeks, delaying the book. As she was nearing full recovery in March, she discovered cysts in her left breast, requiring a mastectomy. By December that year, Carson discovered that she had breast cancer, which had metastasized. Her research was also delayed by revision work for a new edition of The Sea Around Us, and by a collaborative photo essay with Erich Hartmann. Most of the research and writing was done by the fall of 1960, except for a discussion of recent research on biological controls and investigations of some new pesticides. However, further health troubles delayed the final revisions in 1961 and early 1962.

The work's title was inspired by a poem by John Keats, "La Belle Dame sans Merci", which contained the lines "The sedge is wither'd from the lake, And no birds sing." "Silent Spring" was initially suggested as a title for the chapter on birds. By August 1961, Carson agreed to the suggestion of her literary agent Marie Rodell: Silent Spring would be a metaphorical title for the entire book—suggesting a bleak future for the whole natural world—rather than a literal chapter title about the absence of birdsong. With Carson's approval, editor Paul Brooks at Houghton Mifflin arranged for illustrations by Louis and Lois Darling, who also designed the cover. The final writing was the first chapter, "A Fable for Tomorrow", which was intended to provide the fact that something like the story in the book could happen any time in the near future. By mid-1962, Brooks and Carson had largely finished the editing and were planning to promote the book by sending the manuscript to select individuals for final suggestions. In Silent Spring, Carson relied on evidence from two New York state organic farmers, Marjorie Spock and Mary Richards, and that of biodynamic farming advocate Ehrenfried Pfeiffer in developing her case against DDT.

== Content ==
The overarching theme of Silent Spring is the powerful—and often negative—effect humans have on the natural world. "In nature, nothing exists alone," writes Carson. Her main argument is that pesticides have detrimental effects on the environment. She argues these are more properly termed "biocides" because their effects are rarely limited to solely targeting pests. DDT is a prime example, but other synthetic pesticides—many of which are subject to bioaccumulation—are scrutinized. Carson accuses the chemical industry of intentionally spreading disinformation and public officials of accepting industry claims uncritically. Most of the book is devoted to pesticides' effects on natural ecosystems, but four chapters detail cases of human pesticide poisoning, cancer, and other illnesses attributed to pesticides. About DDT and cancer, Carson says only:

In laboratory tests on animal subjects, DDT has produced suspicious liver tumors. Scientists of the Food and Drug Administration who reported the discovery of these tumors were uncertain how to classify them, but felt there was some "justification for considering them low grade hepatic cell carcinomas". Dr. Hueper [author of Occupational Tumors and Allied Diseases] now gives DDT the definite rating of a "chemical carcinogen".

Carson predicts increased consequences in the future, especially since targeted pests may develop resistance to pesticides and weakened ecosystems fall prey to unanticipated invasive species. The book closes with a call for a biotic approach to pest control as an alternative to chemical pesticides.

Carson never called for an outright ban on DDT. She said in Silent Spring that even if DDT and other insecticides had no environmental side effects, their indiscriminate overuse was counterproductive because it would create insect resistance to pesticides, making them useless in eliminating the target insect populations:

No responsible person contends that insect-borne disease should be ignored. The question that has now urgently presented itself is whether it is either wise or responsible to attack the problem by methods that are rapidly making it worse. The world has heard much of the triumphant war against disease through the control of insect vectors of infection, but it has heard little of the other side of the story—the defeats, the short-lived triumphs that now strongly support the alarming view that the insect enemy has been made actually stronger by our efforts. Even worse, we may have destroyed our very means of fighting.

Carson also said that "Malaria programmes are threatened by resistance among mosquitoes", and quoted the advice given by the director of Holland's Plant Protection Service: "Practical advice should be 'Spray as little as you possibly can' rather than 'Spray to the limit of your capacity'. Pressure on the pest population should always be as slight as possible."

=== Politics ===
At the time the book was written, environmental issues were excluded from mainstream political conversation in America. However, Carson believed that governments should consider what environmental impact a policy may have before implementing it; for example, in chapter 10 she describes a pesticide program from 1957 that was intended to control the spread of fire ants:

With the development of chemicals of broad lethal powers, there came a sudden change in the official attitude towards the fire ant. In 1957 the United States Department of Agriculture launched one of the most remarkable publicity campaigns in its history. The fire ant suddenly became the target of a barrage of government releases, motion pictures, and government-inspired stories portraying it as a despoiler of southern agriculture and a killer of birds, livestock, and man. A mighty campaign was announced, in which the federal government in cooperation with the afflicted states would ultimately treat some 20,000,000 acres in nine southern states.

Despite calls from experts to consider the damage using the pesticides could bring to the environment, the Agriculture Department dismissed the objections and continued on with the program:

Urgent protests were made by most of the state conservation departments, by national conservation agencies, and by ecologists and even by some entomologists, calling upon the then Secretary of Agriculture, Ezra Benson, to delay the program at least until some research had been done to determine the effects of heptachlor and dieldrin on wild and domestic animals and to find the minimum amount that would control the ants. The protests were ignored and the program was launched in 1958. A million acres were treated the first year. It was clear that any research would be in the nature of a post mortem.

After the program, an increased number of birds, cattle, horses and other wildlife were found dead in the areas where the pesticides had been sprayed. To make matters worse, the heptachlor and dieldrin sprayed accomplished nothing, instead creating more infested areas. Had the government researched the impact the chemicals could have on wildlife they could have prevented the deaths and environmental damage and saved the taxpayer's money. Overall, Silent Spring not only uncovered the many negative effects pesticides have on the environment but also asked for environmental issues to be discussed and treated seriously within the political sphere.

== Promotion and reception ==
Carson and the others involved with publication of Silent Spring expected fierce criticism and were concerned about the possibility of being sued for libel. Carson was undergoing radiation therapy for her cancer and expected to have little energy to defend her work and respond to critics. In preparation for the anticipated attacks, Carson and her agent attempted to amass prominent supporters before the book's release.

Most of the book's scientific chapters were reviewed by scientists with relevant expertise, among whom Carson found strong support. Carson attended the White House Conference on Conservation in May 1962; Houghton Mifflin distributed proof copies of Silent Spring to many of the delegates and promoted the upcoming serialization in The New Yorker. Carson also sent a proof copy to Supreme Court Associate Justice William O. Douglas, a long-time environmental advocate who had argued against the court's rejection of the Long Island pesticide spraying case and had provided Carson with some of the material included in her chapter on herbicides.

Though Silent Spring had generated a fairly high level of interest based on pre-publication promotion, this became more intense with its serialization, which began in the June 16, 1962, issue. This brought the book to the attention of the chemical industry and its lobbyists, as well as the American public. Around that time, Carson learned that Silent Spring had been selected as the Book of the Month for October; she said this would "carry it to farms and hamlets all over that country that don't know what a bookstore looks like—much less The New Yorker". Other publicity included a positive editorial in The New York Times and excerpts of the serialized version were published in Audubon Magazine. There was another round of publicity in July and August as chemical companies responded. The story of the birth defect-causing drug thalidomide had broken just before the book's publication, inviting comparisons between Carson and Frances Oldham Kelsey, the Food and Drug Administration reviewer who had blocked the drug's sale in the United States.

In the weeks before the September 27, 1962, publication, there was strong opposition to Silent Spring from the chemical industry. DuPont, a major manufacturer of DDT and 2,4-D, and Velsicol Chemical Company, the only manufacturer of chlordane and heptachlor, were among the first to respond. DuPont compiled an extensive report on the book's press coverage and estimated impact on public opinion. Velsicol threatened legal action against Houghton Mifflin, and The New Yorker and Audubon Magazine unless their planned Silent Spring features were canceled. Chemical industry representatives and lobbyists lodged a range of non-specific complaints, some anonymously. Chemical companies and associated organizations produced brochures and articles promoting and defending pesticide use. However, Carson's and the publishers' lawyers were confident in the vetting process Silent Spring had undergone. The magazine and book publications proceeded as planned, as did the large Book-of-the-Month printing, which included a pamphlet by William O. Douglas endorsing the book.

American Cyanamid biochemist Robert White-Stevens and former Cyanamid chemist Thomas Jukes were among the most aggressive critics, especially of Carson's analysis of DDT. According to White-Stevens, "If man were to follow the teachings of Miss Carson, we would return to the Dark Ages, and the insects and diseases and vermin would once again inherit the earth". Others attacked Carson's personal character and scientific credentials, her training being in marine biology rather than biochemistry. White-Stevens called her "a fanatic defender of the cult of the balance of nature". According to historian Linda Lear the former US Secretary of Agriculture Ezra Taft Benson, asked in a letter to former President Dwight D. Eisenhower, "Why a spinster with no children was so concerned about genetics?" Benson's conclusion was Carson was "probably a Communist".

Monsanto published 5,000 copies of a parody called "The Desolate Year" (1962) which projected a world of famine and disease caused by banning pesticides.

Many critics repeatedly said Carson was calling for the elimination of all pesticides, but she had made it clear she was not advocating this but was instead encouraging responsible and carefully managed use with an awareness of the chemicals' impact on ecosystems. She concludes her section on DDT in Silent Spring with advice for spraying as little as possible to limit the development of resistance. Mark Hamilton Lytle writes, Carson "quite self-consciously decided to write a book calling into question the paradigm of scientific progress that defined postwar American culture".

The academic community—including prominent defenders such as H. J. Muller, Loren Eiseley, Clarence Cottam and Frank Egler—mostly backed the book's scientific claims and public opinion backed Carson's text. The chemical industry campaign was counterproductive because the controversy increased public awareness of the potential dangers of pesticides, an early example of the Streisand Effect. Pesticide use became a major public issue after a CBS Reports television special, The Silent Spring of Rachel Carson, which was broadcast on April 3, 1963. The program included segments of Carson reading from Silent Spring and interviews with other experts, mostly critics including White-Stevens. According to biographer Linda Lear, "in juxtaposition to the wild-eyed, loud-voiced Dr. Robert White-Stevens in white lab coat, Carson appeared anything but the hysterical alarmist that her critics contended". Reactions from the estimated audience of ten to fifteen million were overwhelmingly positive and the program spurred a congressional review of pesticide hazards and the public release of a pesticide report by the President's Science Advisory Committee. Within a year of publication, attacks on the book and on Carson had lost momentum.

In one of her last public appearances, Carson testified before President John F. Kennedy's Science Advisory Committee, which issued its report on May 15, 1963, largely backing Carson's scientific claims. Following the report's release, Carson also testified before a US Senate subcommittee to make policy recommendations. Though Carson received hundreds of other speaking invitations, she was unable to accept most of them because her health was steadily declining, with only brief periods of remission. She spoke as much as she could, and appeared on The Today Show and gave speeches at several dinners held in her honor. In late 1963, she received a flurry of awards and honors: the Audubon Medal from the National Audubon Society, the Cullum Geographical Medal from the American Geographical Society, and induction into the American Academy of Arts and Letters. Of Carson, Maria Popova wrote, "Her lyrical writing rendered her not a mere translator of the natural world, but an alchemist transmuting the steel of science into the gold of wonder."

== Translations ==
The book was translated into many languages including German, French, Dutch, Japanese, Russian and Italian.

- German: Der stumme Frühling, first edition 1963.
- French: Printemps silencieux, first edition 1963.
- Dutch: Dode lente, first edition 1964 or 1962
- Japanese: 生と死の妙薬, first edition 1964. Successive prints post-2001 titled 沈黙の春
- Russian: Безмолвная весна, first edition 1965.
- Swedish: Tyst vår, first edition 1963.
- Chinese: 寂静的春天, first edition 1979.
- Italian: Primavera silenziosa.
- Spanish: Primavera silenciosa.
- Danish: Det Tavse Forår.
- Finnish: Äänetön kevät, first edition 1962, after parts of the book were published in an 8-part article series by the largest subscription newspaper, Helsingin Sanomat (Helsinki times/news), earlier that year.

== Impact ==
=== Grassroots environmentalism and the EPA ===
Carson's work had a powerful impact on the environmental movement. Silent Spring became a rallying point for the new social movement in the 1960s. According to environmental engineer and Carson scholar H. Patricia Hynes, "Silent Spring altered the balance of power in the world. No one since would be able to sell pollution as the necessary underside of progress so easily or uncritically." Carson's work and the activism it inspired are partly responsible for the deep ecology movement and the strength of the grassroots environmental movement since the 1960s. It was also influential to the rise of ecofeminism and to many feminist scientists. Carson's most direct legacy in the environmental movement was the campaign to ban the use of DDT in the United States, and related efforts to ban or limit its use throughout the world. The 1967 formation of the Environmental Defense Fund was the first major milestone in the campaign against DDT. The organization brought lawsuits against the government to "establish a citizen's right to a clean environment", and the arguments against DDT largely mirrored Carson's. By 1972, the Environmental Defense Fund and other activist groups had succeeded in securing a phase-out of DDT use in the United States, except in emergency cases.

The creation of the Environmental Protection Agency by the Nixon Administration in 1970 addressed another concern that Carson had written about. Until then, the USDA was responsible both for regulating pesticides and promoting the concerns of the agriculture industry; Carson saw this as a conflict of interest, since the agency was not responsible for effects on wildlife or other environmental concerns beyond farm policy. Fifteen years after its creation, one journalist described the EPA as "the extended shadow of Silent Spring". Much of the agency's early work, such as enforcement of the 1972 Federal Insecticide, Fungicide, and Rodenticide Act, was directly related to Carson's work. Contrary to the position of the pesticide industry, the DDT phase-out action taken by the EPA (led by William Ruckelshaus) implied that there was no way to adequately regulate DDT use. Ruckelshaus' conclusion was that DDT could not be used safely. History professor Gary Kroll wrote, "Rachel Carson's Silent Spring played a large role in articulating ecology as a 'subversive subject'—as a perspective that cuts against the grain of materialism, scientism, and the technologically engineered control of nature."

In a 2013 interview, Ruckelshaus briefly recounted his decision to ban DDT except for emergency uses, noting that Carson's book featured DDT and for that reason the issue drew considerable public attention.

Former Vice President of the United States and environmentalist Al Gore wrote an introduction to the 1992 edition of Silent Spring. He wrote: "Silent Spring had a profound impact ... Indeed, Rachel Carson was one of the reasons that I became so conscious of the environment and so involved with environmental issues ... [she] has had as much or more effect on me than any, and perhaps than all of them together."

=== Debate over environmentalism and DDT restrictions ===
Carson has been targeted by some organizations opposed to the environmental movement, including Roger Bate of the pro-DDT advocacy group Africa Fighting Malaria and the libertarian think tank Competitive Enterprise Institute (CEI); these sources oppose restrictions on DDT, attribute large numbers of deaths to such restrictions, and argue that Carson was responsible for them. These arguments have been dismissed as "outrageous" by former World Health Organization scientist Socrates Litsios. May Berenbaum, University of Illinois entomologist, says, "to blame environmentalists who oppose DDT for more deaths than Hitler is worse than irresponsible". Investigative journalist Adam Sarvana and others characterize this notion as a "myth" promoted principally by Bate.

In the 1990s and 2000s, campaigns against the book intensified, in part due to efforts by the tobacco industry to cast larger doubt on science-driven policy as a way of contesting bans on smoking. In 2009, the heavily corporate-funded CEI set up a website falsely blaming Carson for deaths to malaria. This triggered a point-by-point rebuttal by biographer William Souder, who reviewed the distortions used by campaigners against Silent Spring.

A 2012 review article in Nature by Rob Dunn commemorating the 50th anniversary of Silent Spring and summarizing the progressive environmental-policy changes made since then, prompted a response in a letter written by Anthony Trewavas and co-signed by 10 others, including Christopher Leaver, Bruce Ames and Peter Lachmann, who quote estimates of 60 to 80 million deaths "as a result of misguided fears based on poorly understood evidence".

Biographer Hamilton Lytle believes these estimates are unrealistic, even if Carson can be "blamed" for worldwide DDT policies. John Quiggin and Tim Lambert wrote, "the most striking feature of the claim against Carson is the ease with which it can be refuted". DDT was never banned for anti-malarial use, and its ban for agricultural use in the United States in 1972 did not apply outside the US nor to anti-malaria spraying. The international treaty that banned most uses of DDT and other organochlorine pesticides—the 2001 Stockholm Convention on Persistent Organic Pollutants (which became effective in 2004)—included an exemption for the use of DDT for malaria control until affordable substitutes could be found. Mass outdoor spraying of DDT was abandoned in poor countries subject to malaria, such as Sri Lanka, in the 1970s and 1980s; this was not because of government prohibitions but because the DDT had lost its ability to kill the mosquitoes. Because of insects' very short breeding cycle and large number of offspring, the most resistant insects survive and pass on their genetic traits to their offspring, which replace the pesticide-slain insects relatively rapidly. Agricultural spraying of pesticides produces pesticide resistance in seven to ten years.

Some experts have said that restrictions placed on the agricultural use of DDT have increased its effectiveness for malaria control. According to pro-DDT advocate Amir Attaran, the result of the (activated in 2004) Stockholm Convention banning DDT's use in agriculture "is arguably better than the status quo ... For the first time, there is now an insecticide which is restricted to vector control only, meaning that the selection of resistant mosquitoes will be slower than before."

=== Legacy ===
Silent Spring has been featured in many lists of the best nonfiction books of the twentieth century. It was fifth in the Modern Library List of Best 20th-Century Nonfiction and number 78 in the National Review's 100 best non-fiction books of the 20th century. In 2006, Silent Spring was named one of the 25 greatest science books of all time by the editors of Discover Magazine. In 2012, the American Chemical Society designated the legacy of Silent Spring a National Historic Chemical Landmark at Chatham University in Pittsburgh.

In 1996, a follow-up book, Beyond Silent Spring, co-written by H. F. van Emden and David Peakall, was published.

In 1967, George Newson composed the tape composition Silent Spring using birdsong recorded at London Zoo as source material. It was premiered at the Queen Elizabeth Hall in January 1968.

Silent Spring is mentioned in the 2008 science fiction novel The Three-Body Problem by Liu Cixin, as well as its Tencent 2023 and Netflix 2024 television series adaptations.

In 2011, the American composer Steven Stucky wrote the eponymously titled symphonic poem Silent Spring to commemorate the fiftieth anniversary of the book's publication. The piece was given its world premiere in Pittsburgh on February 17, 2012, with the conductor Manfred Honeck leading the Pittsburgh Symphony Orchestra.

Naturalist David Attenborough has stated that Silent Spring was probably the book that had changed the scientific world the most, after the On the Origin of Species by Charles Darwin.

== See also ==
- Blessed Unrest (2007), by Paul Hawken
- Our Stolen Future (1996), by Theo Colburn, et al.
- Our Synthetic Environment (1962), by Murray Bookchin
- Pandora's Box (1992), by Adam Curtis
- The Closing Circle (1971), by Barry Commoner
- The Everglades: River of Grass (1947), by Marjory Stoneman Douglas
- Bioaccumulation
- Biomagnification
- Chemosterilant
- Earth Strike
- Silent Spring Institute
- Sterile insect technique
- Toxins

== Sources and further reading ==
- Berry-Cabán, Cristóbal S. "DDT and silent spring: fifty years after". Journal of Military and Veterans' Health 19 (2011): 19–24. online Archived 2021-03-08 at the Wayback Machine
- Brinkley, Douglas. Silent Spring Revolution: John F. Kennedy, Rachel Carson, Lyndon Johnson, Richard Nixon, and the Great Environmental Awakening (2022) excerpt Archived 2022-12-17 at the Wayback Machine
- Carson, Rachel (1962). Silent Spring. Houghton Mifflin Company.
  - Silent Spring & Other Writings (Library of America, 2018)
  - Carson, Rachel (2002) [1st. Pub. Houghton Mifflin, 1962]. Silent Spring. Mariner Books. ISBN 978-0-618-24906-0. Silent Spring initially appeared serialized in three parts in the June 16, June 23, and June 30, 1962, issues of The New Yorker magazine
- Dunlap, Thomas, ed. DDT, Silent Spring, and the Rise of Environmentalism (University of Washington Press, 2008),
- Graham, Frank (1970) [1st. Pub. Houghton Mifflin, 1970]. Since Silent Spring. Fawcett. ISBN 978-0-449-23141-8.
- Hynes, H. Patricia (1989). The Recurring Silent Spring. Athene series. New York: Pergamon Press. ISBN 978-0-08-037117-7.
- Lytle, Mark Hamilton (2007). The Gentle Subversive: Rachel Carson, Silent Spring, and the Rise of the Environmental Movement. New York: Oxford University Press. ISBN 978-0-19-517246-1.
- Lear, Linda (1997). Rachel Carson: Witness for Nature. New York: Henry Holt and Company. ISBN 978-0-8050-3428-8.
- Murphy, Priscilla Coit (2005). What A Book Can Do: The Publication and Reception of Silent Spring. University of Massachusetts Press. ISBN 978-1-55849-476-3.
- Litmans, Brian; Miller, Jeff (2004). Silent Spring Revisited: Pesticide Use And Endangered Species. Diane Publishing Co. ISBN 978-0-7567-4439-7.
- United States Environmental Protection Agency "What is DDT?". Retrieved April 26, 2006
- "'DDT Chemical Backgrounder', National Safety Council". Archived from the original on December 26, 2005.. Retrieved May 30, 2005
- Report on Carcinogens Archived 2011-06-08 at the Wayback Machine, 12th Edition Archived 2025-07-31 at the Wayback Machine; US Department of Health and Human Services, Public Health Service, National Institute of Environmental Health Sciences Archived 2025-07-16 at the Wayback Machine, National Toxicology Program Archived 2012-02-22 at the Wayback Machine (June 10, 2011)
- Oreskes, Naomi; Conway, Erik M. (2010). Merchants of Doubt. New York: Bloomsbury. ISBN 978-1-59691-610-4.
- American Chemical Society (1986). Silent Spring Revisited. ISBN 0-317-59798-1.
