= Peter Michael Hammond =

British entomologist (1941–2021)

- Born: 17 February 1941
- Died: 17 September 2021 (aged 80)
- Occupation: Entomologist

Peter Michael Hammond (17 February 1941 – 17 September 2021) was a British entomologist who specialised in Coleoptera (beetles). For many years he was the head of the Coleoptera section at the Natural History Museum, London.

After working for a time in China, Hammond was appointed to his job at the NHM in the 1960s by the museum's then-head Coleopterist Jack Balfour-Browne (1907–2002). By the late 1960s Hammond was appearing in newspapers as a Museum spokesperson for the Coleoptera section.

Hammond's special interest area was the Staphylinidae (rove beetles), but he worked on all families of beetle.

Hammond, with Jane Marshall, worked on Fritz van Emden's (1898–1958) specimens in the 1970s and contributed to the Monograph originally instigated by van Emden's research into beetle larvae, published by the Royal Entomological Society in 2019: British Coleoptera Larvae. A guide to the families and major subfamilies, edited by Max Barclay and Beulah Garner.

From 1981, Hammond served as an editor on the Entomologist's Monthly Magazine, and contributed book reviews.

Hammond was known for his talent for surveying areas for beetles, whether researching unpopulated forest areas or suburban spaces, for example using Chinese lanterns and takeaway food containers to entice Oxypoda nigrocincta, Clambus apllidulus and Cossonus linearis during a beetle survey undertaken with the London Wildlife Trust in Hounslow in 1998.

Because of what was then a museum rule for mandatory retirement at age 60, in 2001 Hammond retired and became a Scientific Associate at the NHM. He continued to travel, collect specimens, research and publish his work.

The Carabidae beetle species Clinidium hammondi R.T. & J.R.Bell, 1985, was named in honour of Hammond.

== Selected publications ==
- Hammond, P.M.: Notes on British Staphylinidae. 1. the status of Olophrum nicholsoni Donisthorpe with notes on the other British species of Olophrum (Coleoptera), Entomologist's Monthly Magazine, vol. 106, pp. 165–170 (1971)
- Hammond, P.M.: Notes on British Staphylinidae. 2. on the British species of Platystethus mannerheim, with one species new to Britain, Entomologist's Monthly Magazine, vol. 107, pp. 93–111 (1971)
- Hammond, P.M. and Bacchus, M.E: Atheta (s. str.) strandiella Brundin (Col., Staphylinidae) new to the British Isles, with notes on other British species of the subgenus. Entomologist’s Monthly Magazine, vol. 107, pp. 153–157 (1972)
- Hammond, P.M.: Notes on British Staphylinidae. 3. The British species of Sepedophilus Gistel (Conosomus auct.)., Entomologist's Monthly Magazine, vol. 108, pp. 130–165 (1973)
- Hammond, P.M: A review of the genus Anotylus C.G. Thomson (Coleoptera: Staphylinidae), Bulletin of the British Museum (Natural History) Entomology, Vol. 33, pp. 139–187 (1976)
- Hammond, P.M.: Wing-folding Mechanisms of Beetles, with Special Reference to Investigations of Adephagan Phylogeny' in T.L. Erwin, G.E. Ball, and D.R. Whitehead, Carabid Beetles: Their Evolution, Natural History, and Classification, pp. 113–180 (1979)
- Hammond, P.M.: Staphylinidae (Coleoptera) in Ireland, 1: Micropeplinae, Proteininae, Omaliinae and Piestinae, The Irish Naturalists' Journal, vol. 20, number 4, pp. 133–140 (1980)
- Hammond, P.M.; Kitching, Roger L.; Stork, Nigel E.: The Composition and Richness of the Tree-Crown Coleoptera Assemblage in an Australian Subtropical Forest, Ecotropica, vol. 2, pp. 99–108 (1996)
- Didham, Raphael K.; Hammond, P.M.; Lawton, John H.; Eggleton, Paul and Stork, Nigel E.: Beetle Species Responses to Tropical Forest Fragmentation, Ecological Monographs (Ecological Society of America), Vol. 68, issue 3 (August 1998)
- Caterino, Michael S.; Shull, Verel L.; Hammond, Peter M.; Vogler, Alfried P.: Basal relationships of Coleoptera inferred from 18S rDNA sequences, Zoologica Scripta, vol. 31, issue 1, pp. 41–49 (2002)
