= Heidelberg Appeal =

The Heidelberg Appeal, authored by Michel Salomon, was an appeal directed against the findings of the Intergovernmental Panel on Climate Change. The Heidelberg Appeal's goal was similar to the later published Leipzig Declaration. Before the publication, Fred Singer, who has initiated several petitions like the Heidelberg Appeal, and Michel Salomon, had organized a conference in Heidelberg, which led to that document. It was published on the last day of the 1992 Rio Summit, and warned against basing environmental policies on what the authors described as "pseudoscientific arguments or false and nonrelevant data." It was initiated by the tobacco and asbestos industries, to support the climate-denying Global Climate Coalition. According to SourceWatch the appeal was "a scam perpetrated by the asbestos and tobacco industries in support of the Global Climate Coalition". Both industries had no direct reason to deny global warming, but rather wanted to promote their "sound science" agenda, which basically states that industry-funded science is good science and science contradicting those science (such as environmental science) is bad science or "junk science".

== Originator ==
Michel Salomon was the editor of the Paris-based "Projections" magazine. They had already been successful with:

- TASSC (The Advancement of Sound Science Coalition) in the US under Steven Milloy,
- SEPP (Science & Environmental Policy Project), run by Fred Singer and semi-attached to TASSC.
- ESEF (European Science and Environment Forum) run by Roger Bate on secondment from the Institute of Economic Affairs in London.

Following the Heidelberg Appeal, Salomon established for them the ICSE (a.k.a. "CIES") which is variously quoted in the tobacco archive documents as the International Center for a Scientific Ecology or, in French, the Centre International pour une Écologie Scientifique.

== Creation ==
The technique used by Salomon's group to enlist members of the scientific establishment to lend their names to climate denial by signing the Appeal document, was quite unique. At this time, some sections of the environmental movement were anti-science, and anti-technology. They blamed the scientists as much as the industrialists for damaging the ecology of the planet.

The document most of the signatories thought they were signing was an appeal for the society to pay more attention to scientists than to the many irrational health and environmental activists. They were objecting to the way in which they were losing their privileged position as the 'go-to authorities' on all such health and environmental matters. They didn't see this as a climate-denial statement.

One of the signatories, Philip Anderson, physicist at Princeton University, cited the continued dispersal of ozone-depleting chlorofluorocarbons (CFCs) as a prime example of an environmentally hazardous situation identified by scientists. He complained that despite science's disapproval, CFC's persists to be released as a result of industrial interests and denial of potential harm. He asserted that:

"It's a sneaky thing to keep the CFC plants going. [... However ... ] industrialists, not scientists are to blame for much of the planet's ecological degradation."

He agreed with Salomon in attacking the animal-rights people as

"clearly irrational?" [... ] "This is obvious when they resort to illegality and violence to propagate their ends." [such] forces "make the public afraid of science."

No draft of the original signed document exists, but participants have since claimed that the document they signed was a general 'motherhood' statement about the need for better science in dealing with hazardous and health-related products. However, when release and publicised by Fred Singer's Science & Environmental Policy Project operation specific mention of climate change was added in the introductory passages and press release. It was carefully released to coincide with the opening of the Rio Earth Summit.

== Usage ==
The Heidelberg Appeal has been enthusiastically embraced by large corporations and individual critics of the environmental movement. Conservative think tanks frequently cite the Heidelberg Appeal as proof that scientists reject the theory of global warming as well as a host of other environmental health risks associated with modern science and industry. Its name has subsequently been adopted by the Heidelberg Appeal Nederland Foundation, which was founded in 1993 and disputes health risks related to nitrates in foods and antibiotic-resistant bacteria. The Heidelberg Appeal was promoted in 1993 by the International Center for a Scientific Ecology, a group set up by Michael Salomon "that was considered important in Philip Morris' plans to create a group in Europe similar to The Advancement of Sound Science Coalition (TASSC)".

== ICSE ==
The Board of the Center:

- Pierre Joly. President of the Association Francaise pour la Recherche Therapeutique: former President of the International Federation of Pharmaceutical Manufacturers Association.
- Constant Burg. honorary member of the State Council honorary managing director of INSERM : President of the Institut Curie:
- Gilbert Rutman. chief mining engineer : President of the Conseil National des ingénieurs et des Scientifiques de France:
- S. Fred Singer, Doctor of Physical Science. President of the Science & Environmental Policy Project: former Director US Weather Satellite Program: Dean of the School of Environmental Sciences. University of Miami: Deputy Assistant Administrator of US EPA:
- Gary Nash. Secretary General of the International Council on Metals and the Environment (ICME) : former Director General in the Canada Department of Energy. Mines and Resources:
- Michel Salomon. coordinator of the Heidelberg Appeal: former science journalist: magazine editor.

The UK tobacco industry's on-going contact to the ICSE (which involved the ability to check and launder their public statements) was conducted through one of the tobacco industry's long-term statistical consultants, Peter N Lee.
