= Civil Society Coalition on Climate Change =

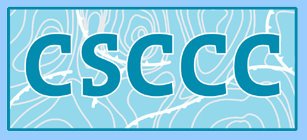
The Civil Society Coalition on Climate Change

The Civil Society Coalition on Climate Change (CSCCC) is an entity that maintains a website and describes itself as a global group of non-profit organizations with a mission of "seek[ing] to educate the public about the science and economics of climate change in an impartial manner." The Coalition identifies its membership as including 60 independent nonprofit organisations from 40 countries "who share a commitment to improving public understanding about a range of public policy issues." It calls itself "a free-market alternative to mainstream environmentalism." An Indian news media report states that it was founded by the International Policy Network, a London-based organization that receives support from ExxonMobil.

The group publishes background papers and opinion editorials on the science and economics of climate change and maintains a blog. Its Civil Society Report on Climate Change was published in 2007, shortly before the United Nations Framework Convention on Climate Change conference in Bali. CSCCC experts make media appearances, such as Julian Morris's 2007 feature on Larry King Live and his televised debate in 2008 with IPCC head Rajendra Pachauri.

This IPN in the UK has Julian Morris as executive director. It is actually a part of the Atlas Group/Network (a.k.a. Atlas Economic Research Institute) which was founded by UK factory-chicken king, Sir Antony Fisher (one of PM Margaret Thatcher's economic gurus) and American Loctite millionaire Richard Krieble. They had funding support from Krieble, Richard Mellon Scaife, and Philip Morris. Fisher is reputed to have had a primary hand in establishing up to 150 libertarian think-tanks around the world.

Fisher's daughter, Linda Whetstone, now works for the (Fisher-founded) Adam Smith Institute. She is also the chairperson of the International Policy Network, and is on the Boards of Directors of the Mont Pelerin Society, the Institute of Economic Affairs and the Atlas Group in the USA. Coalitions and networks of this kind a common with Atlas Group think-tanks, and many of their key staff and directors serve on many different organisations. This faux-multiplicity amplifies the apparent strength of the public attacks on climate-change science. See also the Stockholm Network. and
