= Mecyclothorax curtipes =

Scientific classification
- Kingdom: Animalia
- Phylum: Arthropoda
- Class: Insecta
- Order: Coleoptera
- Suborder: Adephaga
- Family: Carabidae
- Genus: Mecyclothorax
- Species: M. curtipes

Binomial name
- Mecyclothorax curtipes (Sharp, 1903)

Species of beetle

Mecyclothorax curtipes is a species of ground beetle in the subfamily Psydrinae. It was described by Sharp in 1903.

== Taxonomy ==
The species was first described in 1903 by the English entomologist David Sharp, and its valid status was confirmed during an audit conducted in 2007 by the American coleopterist James Kenneth Liebherr (Cornell University, Ithaca, USA)
