= Fritz Isidore van Emden =

- Born: 3 October 1898; Amsterdam, Netherlands
- Died: 2 September 1958 (aged 59); Wimbledon, London, U.K.
- Occupation: Entomologist
- Years active: 1919–1958

Fritz Isidore van Emden (1898 – 1958) also known as Frits van Emden was an entomologist who specialized in Coleoptera and Diptera.

== Biography ==
Fritz Isidore van Emden was born in Amsterdam on 3 October 1898. Van Emden's parents were textile dealer Abraham van Emden (1873-1939) and Konstanze Irma Lippman (1875-1949), who had married at Leipzig on 23 March 1897.

In 1900, the van Emden family moved from the Netherlands to Germany after Abraham's textile business went into bankruptcy, as the law in the Netherlands at that time meant that a person who was declared bankrupt could not begin a new business. Fritz van Emden later recalled to his son Helmut that seeing insects attacking his father's stock had sparked his interest in Entomology.

Van Emden was educated at the Nikolaischule in Leipzig from 1909-1912; he then attended the High School at Waldenberg. He studied Natural Sciences at the University of Leipzig and received his doctorate in 1921. His first professional entomology job was working with Walther Horn at the Deutsches Entomologisches Institut in Berlin-Dhalem.

Van Emden became a Carabidae specialist and from 1927 worked at the Staatliches Museum für Tierkunde und Völkerkunde in Dresden, where he was a mentor to Willi Hennig. In 1932 van Emden attended the 5th International Congress of Entomology at Paris as a German representative. Because Van Emden's mother was Jewish, he faced persecution when the Nazis came to power in 1933 and he was barred from Civil Service employment. Van Emden was reported for his Jewish heritage by the Dresden Museum's director, Arnold Jacobi, who let him continue his private research in the Museum library, though unpaid. A plaque in Dresden commemorates van Emden's last German workplace and subsequent flight from Germany.

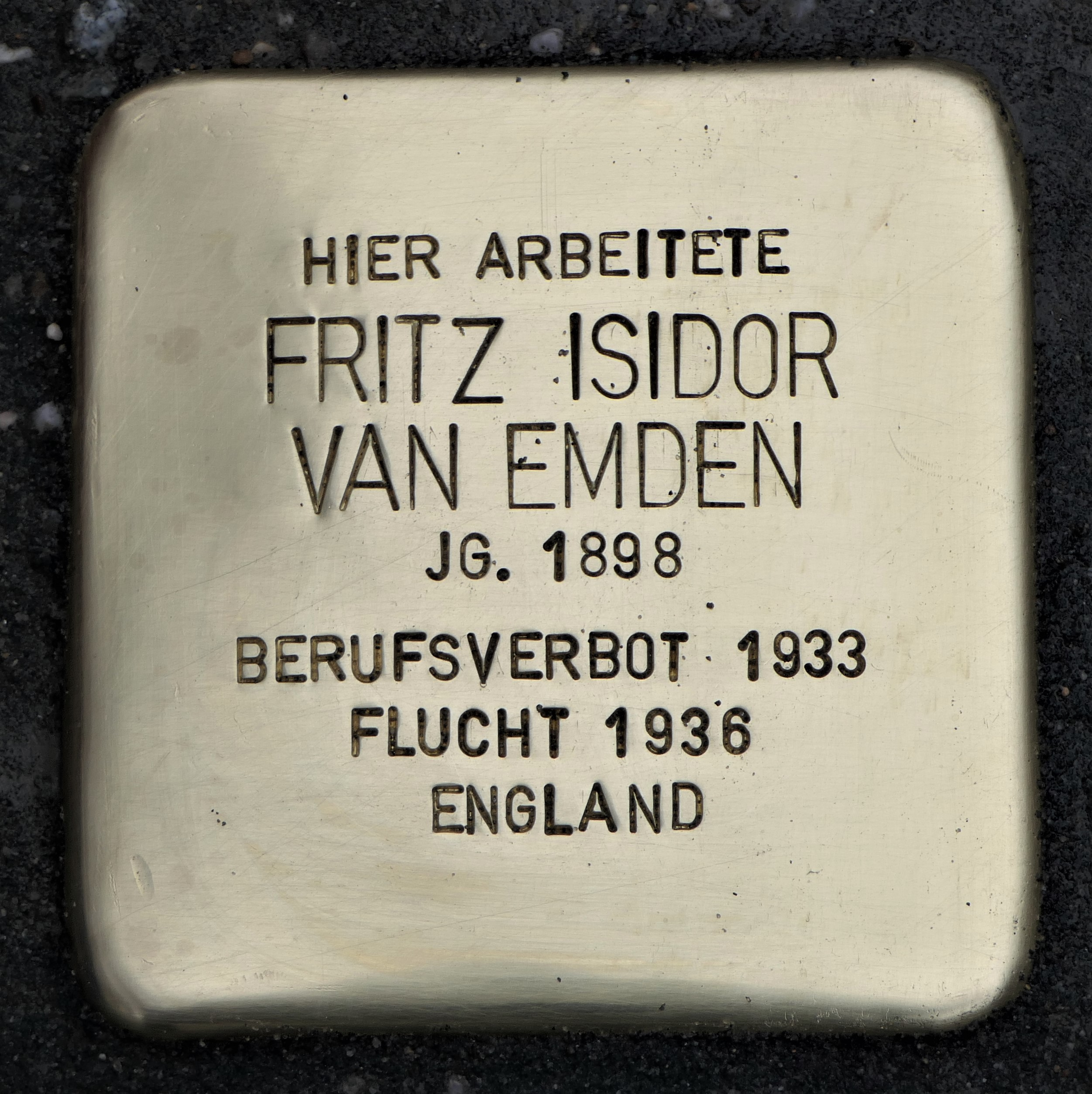
Stolperstein (stumbling stone) commemorating Fritz Isidore van Emden, in the Ostra-Allee (Kronentor), Dresden.

Needing to support his family, Van Emden considered an employment offer from the Budapest Museum in Hungary, but he was also offered a job at the British Museum (Natural History) by Deputy Keeper and Coleoptera specialist Gilbert Arrow, which he accepted, saying his enjoyment of English steamed puddings had swayed his decision. In 1936 Van Emden emigrated with his wife and two young sons to England where he was supported by a grant from The Society for the Protection of Science and Learning and worked for the Imperial Institute of Entomology, based at the British Museum. As British Museum curators were discouraged from working on collection areas where they themselves had a competing private collection, Van Emden switched to working on Diptera (the "caterpillar-flies" Tachinidae) so he would not have to give up research work upon his own beetle collection. On the 1939 register of England taken shortly after WW2 began Van Emden is described as an "Asst. Entomologist (Dipterist)", identifying specimens sent to him by medical and agricultural workers. Van Emden was interviewed and granted exemption from Internment on 10 October 1939.

The Nazis placed van Emden on their list of people to be arrested by the SS if a Nazi invasion of the U.K. was successful.

In his free time outside of work, van Emden devoted himself to Coleoptera studies, particularly the study of larvae. In 1947 van Emden became a naturalised British Citizen.

Van Emden died of a brain tumour on 2 September 1958 shortly before he was due to retire, with his research project of a monograph on British beetle larvae unfinished. His specimens and paperwork were passed on to the Natural History Museum, London by Helmut Fritz van Emden (who himself became a notable entomologist) with the hope that his father's work could be continued. Van Emden's research topic of beetle larvae identification was revisited by the Museum's Coleopterists and written up into a new guide published by the Royal Entomological Society in 2019, British Coleoptera Larvae. A guide to the families and major subfamilies, edited by Max Barclay and Beulah Garner.

== Selected publications ==
- Van Emden, Fritz: Versuch einer Aufstellung von Gattungsbestimmungstabellen der Carabidenlarven (Col.), Supplementa Entomologica, volume VIII, pages 1–33 (1919)
- Van Emden, Frits [sic]: Zur Kenntnis der Brutpflege von Asellus aquaticus nebst Bemerkungen über die Brutpflege anderer Isopoden, Archiv für Naturgeschichte, Volume 88 Abteilung A, pages 91–133 (1922)
- Van Emden, Fritz: Die verwandtschaftliche Stellung von Euxestus nebst Beschreibung neuer Arten der Gattung, Tijdschrift voor Entomologie, volume 71, pages 84–110 (1928)
- Van Emden, Fritz: Vier neue Carabiden des Museums für Tierkunde zu Dresden, Deutsche Entomologische Zeitschrift, pages 375-384 (1928)
- Van Emden, Fritz: Zur kenntnis der morphologie und ökologie des brotkäfer-parasiten cephalonomia quadridentata duchaussoy. Zeitschrift für Morphologie und Ökologie der Tiere, volume 23, pages 425–574 (1931)
- Van Emden, Fritz: An Indian Cerambycid damaging Tea Cases. Bulletin of Entomological Research, 28(2), pages 321-323. (1937)
- Van Emden, F.I.: On the Genus Thaumaphrastus Blaisdell (Coleoptera: Thorictidae). Bulletin of the Brooklyn Entomological Society, (XLVI), pages 39–41 (April 1951)
