= Ioan Mihai Cochinescu =

Romanian novelist and essayist

Ioan Mihai Cochinescu (Romanian pronunciation: [iˈo̯an miˈhaj kokiˈnesku]; born April 16, 1951) is a Romanian novelist and essayist. He is also a film script author and director, an art photographer, teacher, musicologist and composer.

== Childhood ==
He was born and grew up in Timișoara, Romania.

== Study ==
1970-1974 he studied music (violin, piano and composition) at The National University for Music in Bucharest. He was granted the Doctor of Music, (Aesthetics) from this university in 2005. His dissertation was on The Venetian baroque music of Antonio Vivaldi.

He is a teacher of Aesthetics at the Fine Arts and Music High School of Ploieşti (Romania).

== Artistic and literary activity ==
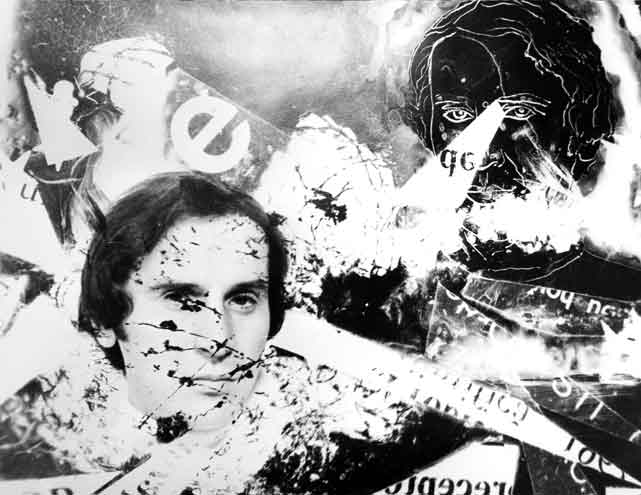
Self-portrait - 1981

During the 1980s he participated in literary circles of Bucharest, which included the Junimea literary circle, led by the critic Ovidiu S. Crohmălniceanu, the Mondays literary circle headed by professor Nicolae Manolescu, the "Ion Luca Caragiale" and other groups in Ploieşti, Câmpina, Mizil, Pucioasa and Slănic. Many of his colleagues and he fought against the Communist censorship.

He has been published in the magazines "Argeș" (1968), "SLAST" (1986), and "Tribuna" (1987). A volume of short stories (1986 Publishing House "Cartea Romaneasca") the censors removed its narrations.

He participated as an Art photographer from 1982–1986 in a number of international competitions in Romania, France, Brazil and Poland, where he won several awards. His essays, articles and translations have been published in the magazine "Fotografia". He is the creator of The Photoplan - and Photospacial Forms, shown in the galleries for photo art AAF (1983 Bucharest), Sala Dalles (1983 Bucharest) and 1986 in Poland. The first national salon for photographic essays, ESEF in Ploieşti was presented by him in 1986.

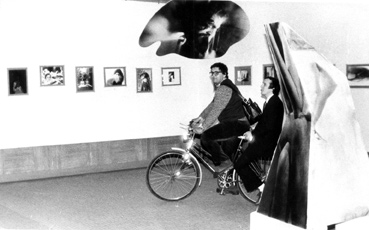
Photoplan - and Photospatial Forms, AAF Photo Gallery in Bucharest - 1983

== Affiliation ==
He is a member of the Writers' Union of Romania (1993), Association of the Art Photographers in Romania - AAF (1982), founder and chairman of the Literary Society Ploieşti - SPLP (1990), initial member (1994) and member executive committee (1996) of the Association of Professional Romanian Writers - ASPRO.

== Books ==
- The Ambassador. Cartea Românească, 1991. ISBN 973-23-0252-6. Novel.
- Rock & Depeche. The movie of a novel. Ploiești: LiberArt, 1993. ISBN 9789739615204. Novel.
- Isabella's Winter Dream (1996). Proža Româňa Contemporaňa. ISBN 973-576-077-0. Short stories.
- The Island. RAO, 1996. Short narrations of the 1980s.
- The Caligraphically Treatise. Ploiești: Noel Computer, 2001. Essays.

The following books are in preparation:

- The Sublime (aesthetic studies 1994)
- Alchimie and music (2005)
- The venetian musical baroque (2005)
- Antonio Vivaldi (2005)

== Movies ==
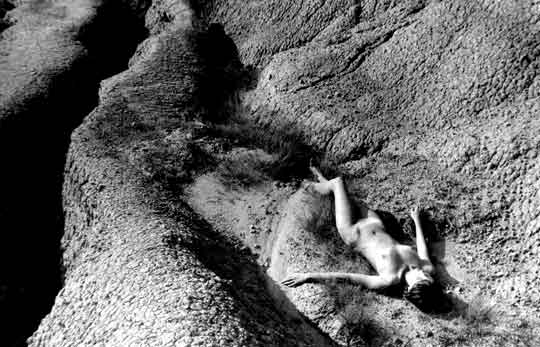
Textures #5 - 1987

- The Last Snowman (1968)
- When the Adults Play it (1969)
- The House on the Hill (1969)
- The City (1970)
- The Fish in the Water (1971)
- The Wedding (1973)

== Broadcast and television ==
- Romanian Broadcast (1997)
- SOTI Television Bucharest (1993)
- Romanian Television - TVR (1973–1974)
- Antena 1 TV Ploieşti (1999–2000) a.s.o.

== Literary awards ==
For his novel, The Ambassador(1991):

- Romanian Academy's Award
- Romanian Writers Union's Award
- Liviu Rebreanu Award

== Bibliography ==
- Ion Bogdan Lefter, „Romanian Writers of the '80s and '90s, A Concise Dictionary” (Editura Paralele 45, 1999, pag.65);
- Academia Română, „Dicționarul General al Literaturii Române” (Editura Univers Enciclopedic, București 2004, lit. C/D, pag. 297);
- Eugen Simion, „Fragmente Critice” (Editura Fundația Scrisul Românesc, 1998, pp. 50–55);
