= Donald R. Roberts =

American professor of entemology

Donald Roberts is a professor of entomology at the Uniformed Services University of the Health Sciences (USUHS) in Bethesda, Maryland, USA.

== Career ==
Roberts became active at the United States Army Medical Corps and worked for the Walter Reed Army Institute of Research (1980 to 1984) and USU (1984 to 2007) spending his career on Malaria prevention. He is known for his intense fights with the WHO advocating for usage of DDT. Contrary to the scientific mainstream he thought of it as an „excellent powder“.

He serves as an advisor to the Bill & Melinda Gates Foundation and is on the board of Africa Fighting Malaria (AFM).

== Publications ==
- Roberts, Donald; Andre, Richard (1994). "Insecticide Resistance Issues in Vector-Borne Disease Control". The American Journal of Tropical Medicine and Hygiene. 50 (6). American Society of Tropical Medicine and Hygiene: 21–34. doi:10.4269/ajtmh.1994.50.21. ISSN 0002-9637. PMID 8024082.

— which is cited by —

Lounibos, L. Philip (2002). "Invasions by insect vectors of human disease". Annual Review of Entomology. 47. Annual Reviews: 233–66. doi:10.1146/ANNUREV.ENTO.47.091201.145206. PMID 11729075. S2CID 28336540.

- Roberts, Donald; Laughlin, Larry; Hsheih, Paul; Legters, Llewellyn (1997). "DDT, Global Strategies, and a Malaria Control Crisis in South America". Emerging Infectious Diseases. 3 (3). Centers for Disease Control and Prevention (US CDC): 295–302. doi:10.3201/eid0303.970305. ISSN 1080-6040. PMC 2627649. PMID 9284373. S2CID 12662918.
- Roberts, Donald; Manguin, S.; Mouchet, J. (2000). "DDT house spraying and re-emerging malaria". The Lancet. 356 (9226). Elsevier: 330–332. doi:10.1016/s0140-6736(00)02516-2. ISSN 0140-6736. PMID 11071203. S2CID 19359748.
- Attaran, Roberts, Curtis, and Kilama. 2000. Balancing risks on the backs of the poor. Nature Medicine. 6(7):729–731.
- "BILATERAL MALARIA ASSISTANCE: PROGRESS AND PROGNOSIS". Federal Fiscal Management, Government Information, and International Security Subcommittee. 2006.
- Roberts, Donald (2007). "Opinion - A New Home for DDT". The New York Times.
- Vetter, Walter; Roberts, Donald (2007). "Revisiting the organohalogens associated with 1979-samples of Brazilian bees (Eufriesea purpurata)". Science of the Total Environment. 377 (2–3). Elsevier BV: 371–377. Bibcode:2007ScTEn.377..371V. doi:10.1016/j.scitotenv.2007.02.009. ISSN 0048-9697. PMID 17379276.
- Grieco, John; Achee, Nicole; Chareonviriyaphap, Theeraphap; Suwonkerd, Wannapa; Chauhan, Kamal; Sardelis, Michael; Roberts, Donald (2007). Krishna, Sanjeev (ed.). "A New Classification System for the Actions of IRS Chemicals Traditionally Used For Malaria Control". PLOS ONE. 2 (8). Public Library of Science: e716. Bibcode:2007PLoSO...2..716G. doi:10.1371/journal.pone.0000716. ISSN 1932-6203. PMC 1934935. PMID 17684562.
