= Elytron (disambiguation) =

Elytron or elytra may refer to:

- Elytron, a modified hardened forewing in certain insect orders
- Elytron (Annelida), ornamental scales on the dorsum of certain annelid families
- Elytron (journal)
