= Peter Hammond =

Peter Hammond may refer to:

- Peter Hammond (Hammond, Louisiana) (1797–1870), Swedish-born American settler for whom Hammond, Louisiana, is named
- Peter Francis Hammond (1887–1971), American politician
- Peter Hammond (priest) (1921–1999), British priest and writer on church architecture
- Peter Hammond (actor) (1923–2011), British actor and television director
- Peter J. Hammond (born 1934), British television writer and novelist
- Peter Michael Hammond (1941–2021), British entomologist
- Peter J. Hammond (economist) (born 1945), British professor of economics
