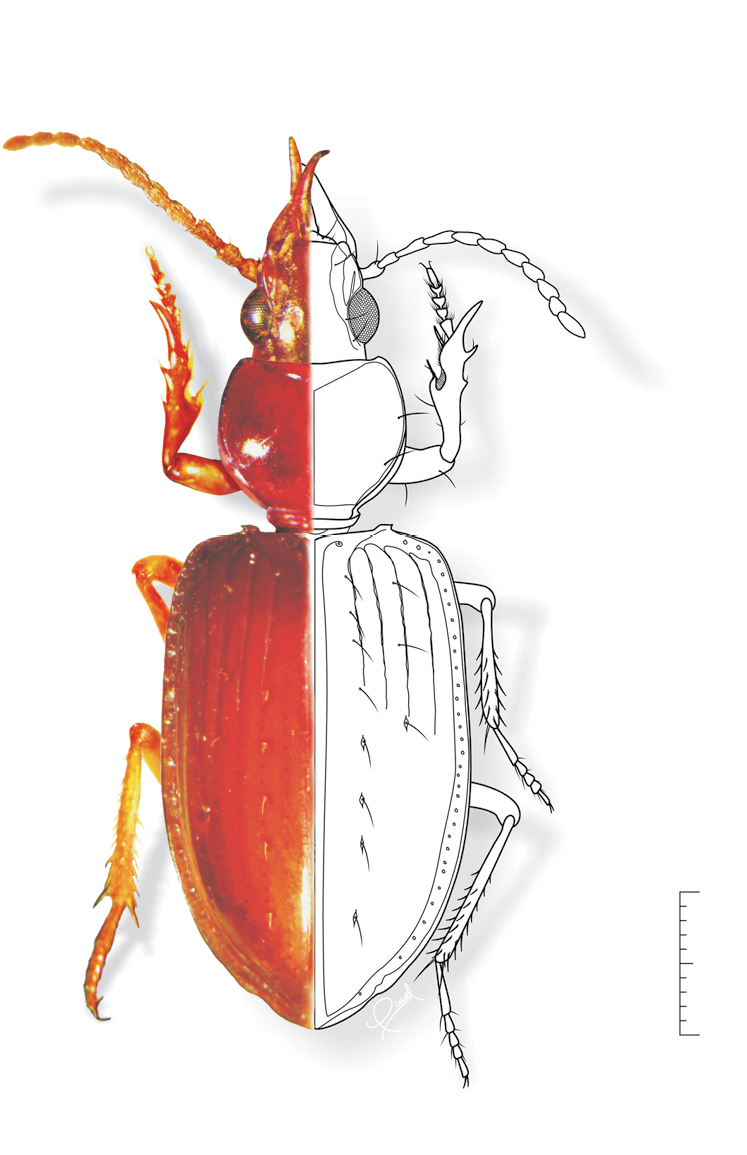
- Semiardistomis darlingtoni, male holotype

Scientific classification
- Kingdom: Animalia
- Phylum: Arthropoda
- Class: Insecta
- Order: Coleoptera
- Suborder: Adephaga
- Family: Carabidae
- Tribe: Clivinini
- Genus: Semiardistomis; Kult, 1950

= Semiardistomis =

Genus of beetles

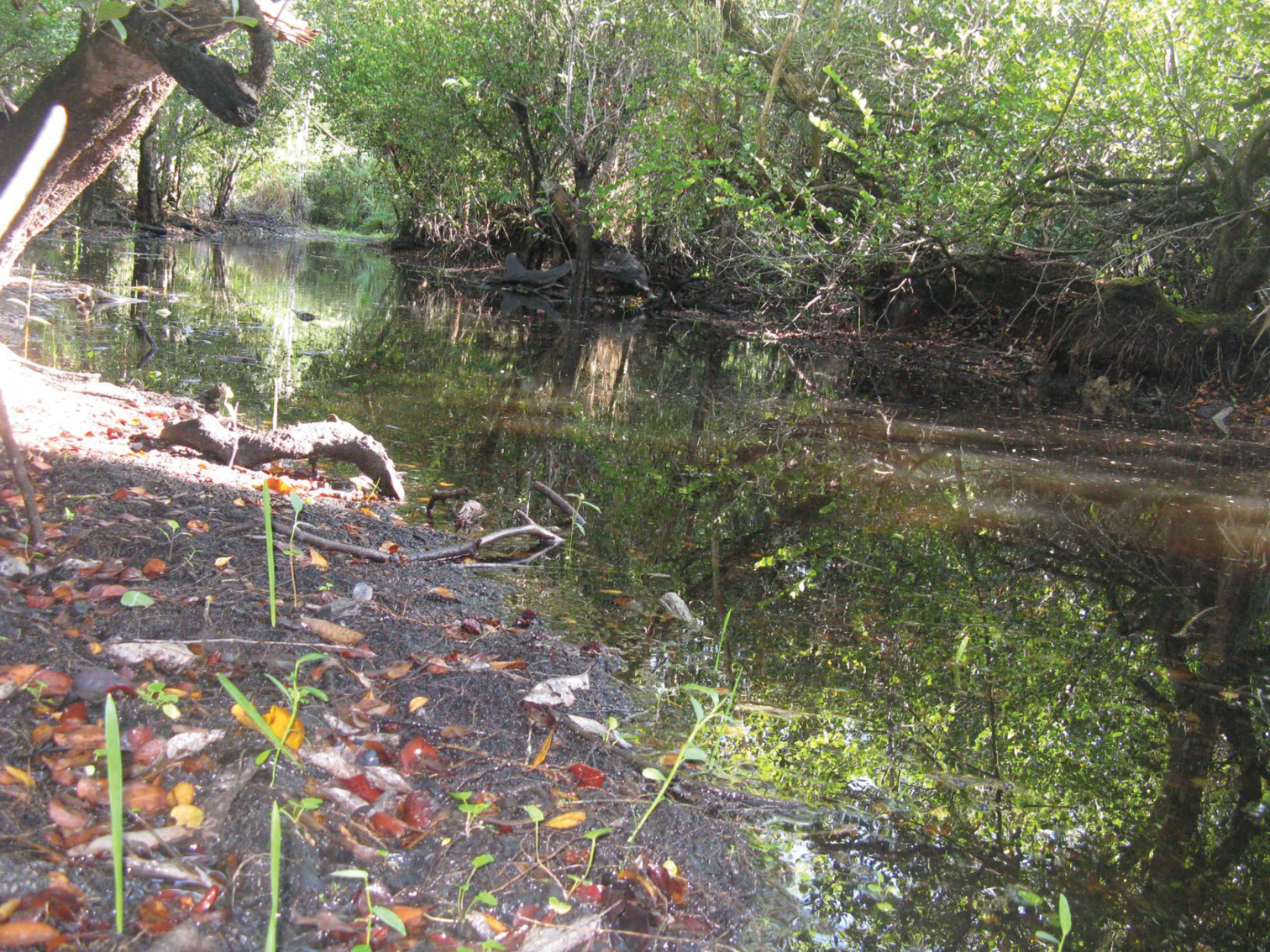
Habitat of Semiardistomis cyaneolimbatus (Chevrolat) on Isla de la Juventud, Cuba.

Semiardistomis is a genus of beetles in the family Carabidae, containing the following species:

- Semiardistomis cordicollis (Putzeys, 1846)
- Semiardistomis cyaneolimbatus (Chevrolat, 1863)
- Semiardistomis darlingtoni (Kult, 1950)
- Semiardistomis deletus (Putzeys, 1846)
- Semiardistomis exspectatus Valdés, 2012
- Semiardistomis flavipes (Dejean, 1831)
- Semiardistomis jedlickai (Kult, 1950)
- Semiardistomis labialis (Chaudoir, 1837)
- Semiardistomis laevistriatus (Fleutiaux & Sallé, 1889)
- Semiardistomis maindroni (Kult, 1950)
- Semiardistomis major Valdés, 2012
- Semiardistomis pallipes (Dejean, 1831)
- Semiardistomis pilosellus (Kult, 1950)
- Semiardistomis propinquus (Putzeys, 1866)
- Semiardistomis puncticollis (Dejean, 1831)
- Semiardistomis rugosus (Putzeys, 1866)
- Semiardistomis semipunctatus (Dejean, 1831)
- Semiardistomis subglabra (van Emden, 1949)
- Semiardistomis viridis (Say, 1823)
