= Making Our Economy Right =

Free market think tank in Bangladesh

- Established: 1991
- Director: Nizam Ahmad
- Budget: US$3,000 to US$5,000
- Address: House 2-A, Block NE (G), Road 84, Gulshan – 2, Dhaka 1212, Bangladesh
- Location: Dhaka, Bangladesh

Making Our Economy Right (MOER) is a free market think tank in Bangladesh. Headquartered in Dhaka, the institute was established in 1991 by Nizam Ahmad. MOER is sponsored by the Atlas Foundation in the United States. Deroy Murdock, an American libertarian syndicated columnist for the Scripps Howard News Service, is an advisory board member of MOER.

As a result of dictatorships and Fabian socialism, which was the basis of Bangladesh's economy for more than 50 years, the concept of individual freedom and free markets is at a rudimentary stage in the country. For this reason, Bangladesh's topmost economists, politicians, businesspeople, and journalists who previously encouraged MOER's work gradually became sceptical of the idea of free markets. Consequently, the theory of free markets advocated by MOER is considered extreme in Bangladesh and the institute has not gained widespread support. Its support base is those people who philosophically believe in individual liberty and personal choice. Much of the work of MOER soon after its establishment focused on spreading the idea of individual freedom, which was almost unknown in the nation.

The annual budget of MOER is US$3,000 to US$5,000. Staff of the institute publish articles advocating free market and libertarianism in national newspapers. MOER has published books both in Bengali and in English languages for free distribution to libraries with the help of the International Policy Network (IPN) headquartered in London. The think tank has published Bengali translation of classical liberal and libertarian works including The Law by French economist Claude Frédéric Bastiat and publications of libertarian think tanks in the west. MOER also moderates a weekly radio broadcast advocating liberalisation of Bangladesh's economy. In 2002 MOER published the book Clamoring for Free Market Freedom in Bangladesh which is a compilation of essays by its founder Nizam Ahmad. It is the fourth book published by the institute and has a foreword by Milton Friedman, Chicago School economist and recipient of the Nobel Memorial Prize in Economics.

== See also ==
- Economic history of Bangladesh
- Politics of Bangladesh
