= Plochionus amandus =

Scientific classification
- Domain: Eukaryota
- Kingdom: Animalia
- Phylum: Arthropoda
- Class: Insecta
- Order: Coleoptera
- Suborder: Adephaga
- Family: Carabidae
- Genus: Plochionus
- Species: P. amandus

Binomial name
- Plochionus amandus Newman, 1840

Species of beetle

Plochionus amandus is a species of ground beetle in the family Carabidae. It is found in North America.

== Subspecies ==
These three subspecies belong to the species Plochionus amandus:

- Plochionus amandus amandus Newman, 1840
- Plochionus amandus discoideus LeConte, 1880
- Plochionus amandus vittatus LeConte, 1844
