= Africa Fighting Malaria =

Non-governmental organization

- Abbreviation: AFM
- Formation: 2000
- Founded at: Washington D.C., U.S.
- Type: Nonprofit organization
- Location: South Africa

Africa Fighting Malaria (AFM) was an NGO based in Washington D.C., United States and South Africa which stated that it "seeks to educate people about the scourge of Malaria and the political economy of malaria control". The organization generally "promotes market based solutions and economic freedom as the best ways to ensure improved welfare and longer life expectancy in poor countries", according to their financial statement. Founded in 2000 during the Stockholm Negotiations on Persistent Organic Pollutants, AFM's original focus was the promotion of a public health exemption for the insecticide DDT for malaria control. According to their website, last updated in 2011, their mission was to "make malaria control more transparent, responsive and effective by holding public institutions accountable for funding and implementing effective, integrated and country-driven malaria control policies."

According to IRS filings, the organization spent money entirely on executive compensation, with no program expenses of any kind. It has been described as a front group established to discredit environmentalists. In documents obtained during state litigation against tobacco companies, founder Roger Bate described the organization's purpose as part of a larger strategy to portray first-world environmentalists as unconcerned with Black Africans. James Lawrence Powell lists Africa Fighting Malaria as a greenscamming organization that is engaged in climate change denial, a statement that is shared by Haydn Washington and John Cook, who also note that it has been funded by ExxonMobil. According to Powell, the website of Africa Fighting Malaria features articles and commentaries opposing ambitious climate mitigation concepts, even though the dangers of malaria could be exacerbated by global warming.

== Overview and History ==
Formed in 2000, AFM's staff members had links with a range of right-wing and free market think tanks including the Competitive Enterprise Institute, Institute of Economic Affairs and Tech Central Station.

AFM promoted the pesticide DDT as a means of fighting malaria. It asserted that global health organizations must be free to employ all available tools to fight malaria and that the limited use of DDT for spraying homes and hospitals is a powerful and necessary tool in this fight.

AFM ran a "Save Children From Malaria" campaign designed to prevent the Stockholm Convention from banning the use of DDT. The coalition consisted of:

- Competitive Enterprise Institute
- Africa Fighting Malaria
- European Science and Environment Forum
- Liberty Institute
- Center for Dissemination of Economic Knowledge (CEDICE)

AFM has not published an Annual Report, or any research, since 2011. The AFM website republishes articles by AFM on a variety of topics, as well as articles on malaria from other sources.

== Funding ==
On its website AFM stated that it "receives its funding from a number of different sources, however because of the nature of our work we have a policy of not accepting funds from any government, the insectcides industry or the pharmaceutical industry".

Funders listed on the AFM website include :

- Anglo American Chairman's Fund
- BHP - a mining corporation.
- The Earhart Foundation
- Hedge Funds vs. Malaria & Pneumonia
- The Ohrstrom Foundation
- The Thiel Foundation
- The Swordspoint Foundation

Other sources of funding:

- Legatum Institute

== People ==
=== Staff ===
- Roger Bate - A fellow of the American Enterprise Institute and Competitive Enterprise Institute, and founder of the European Science and Environment Forum.
- Lorraine Mooney - Previously director of the European Science and Environment Forum.
- Francois Maartens
- Carlos Odora
- Richard Tren - Director. Also a fellow of the Institute of Economic Affairs, and analyst for the Free Market Foundation.
- Jasson Urbach - South African Director. Also a director of the Free Market Foundation of South Africa.

=== Board ===
- Roger Bate
- Richard Tren
- Lance Laifer - co-founder of Hegde Fund vs. Malaria & Pneumonia
- Gerry Ohrstrom - of the Ohrstrom Foundation, Inc. Also affiliated with the Reason Foundation, the Property and Environment Research Center, the International Policy Network, and the American Council on Science and Health.
- Donald Roberts - an emeritus professor of tropical public health at the Uniformed Services University of the Health Sciences.
