= John Blundell (economist) =

British economist (1952–2014)

- Born: 9 October 1952; Congleton, Cheshire, England
- Died: 22 July 2014 (aged 61)

Academic background
- Education: London School of Economics

Academic work
- School or tradition: Austrian School

John Blundell (9 October 1952 – 22 July 2014) was a British economist who served as director general and the Ralph Harris Fellow at the Institute of Economic Affairs. Blundell was involved in the creation and development of numerous free-market think tanks.

== Early life ==
Born in Congleton, Cheshire, on 9 October 1952, he was educated at The King's School, Macclesfield, and at the London School of Economics.

== Career ==
He headed the Press, Research and Parliamentary Liaison Office at the Federation of Small Businesses from 1977 to 1982, and was a Lambeth London Borough Councillor from 1978 to 1982. From 1982 to 1993, he lived in the United States, where he was president of the Institute for Humane Studies (1988–1991), president of the Atlas Economic Research Foundation (1987–1991), president of the board of the Congressional Schools of Virginia (1988–1992) and president of the Charles G. Koch and Claude R. Lambe Charitable Foundations (1991–1992).

Blundell became director general of the Institute of Economic Affairs on 1 January 1993.

Blundell served as co-founder and chairman of the Institute for Children in Boston, Massachusetts (1993–1997); founder and director of the Institute for Justice in Washington D.C. (1991–1993); international trustee of The Fraser Institute in Vancouver, British Columbia (1988–1993); and founder trustee of the Buckeye Institute in Ohio.

Blundell was a director of Fairbridge and of the International Policy Network, and chairman of the Institute Development and Relations Committee on the board of Atlas Economic Research Foundation. He was also a board member of the Institute for Humane Studies at George Mason University in Fairfax, Virginia; of the Institute of Economic Studies in Paris, France; and, until 2012, of the Mont Pelerin Society.

== Death ==
Blundell died on 22 July 2014 at the age of 61.

== Works ==
Books

- Female Force: Ayn Rand, with Todd Tennant and Jaymes Reed. Bluewater Productions, 2011. ISBN 978-1450749244.
- Government Failure, with Alan Peacock, Otmar Issing, Richard Allen Epstein, Carolyn Fairbairn, David B. Smith, Geoffrey Edward Wood, James Tooley and David Graham. London: Institute of Economic Affairs, 2003. ISBN 978-0255365475.
- Ladies For Liberty: Women Who Made a Difference in American History. Algora Publishing, 2011. ISBN 978-0875868660.
- Margaret Thatcher: A Portrait of the Iron Lady. Algora Publishing, 2008. ISBN 978-0875866314.
- Regulation Without the State: The Debate Continues, with Colin Robinson. London: Institute of Economic Affairs, 2000. ISBN 978-0255364836.
- Waging the War of Ideas. London: Institute of Economic Affairs, 2003. ISBN 978-0255365475.

Articles

- "Arthur Seldon CBE and the IEA". Liberty Fund, November 2013.
- "IHS and the Rebirth of Austrian Economics: Some Reflections on 1974–1976". The Quarterly Journal of Austrian Economics, Vol. 17, No. 1, Spring 2014, pp. 92–107.
