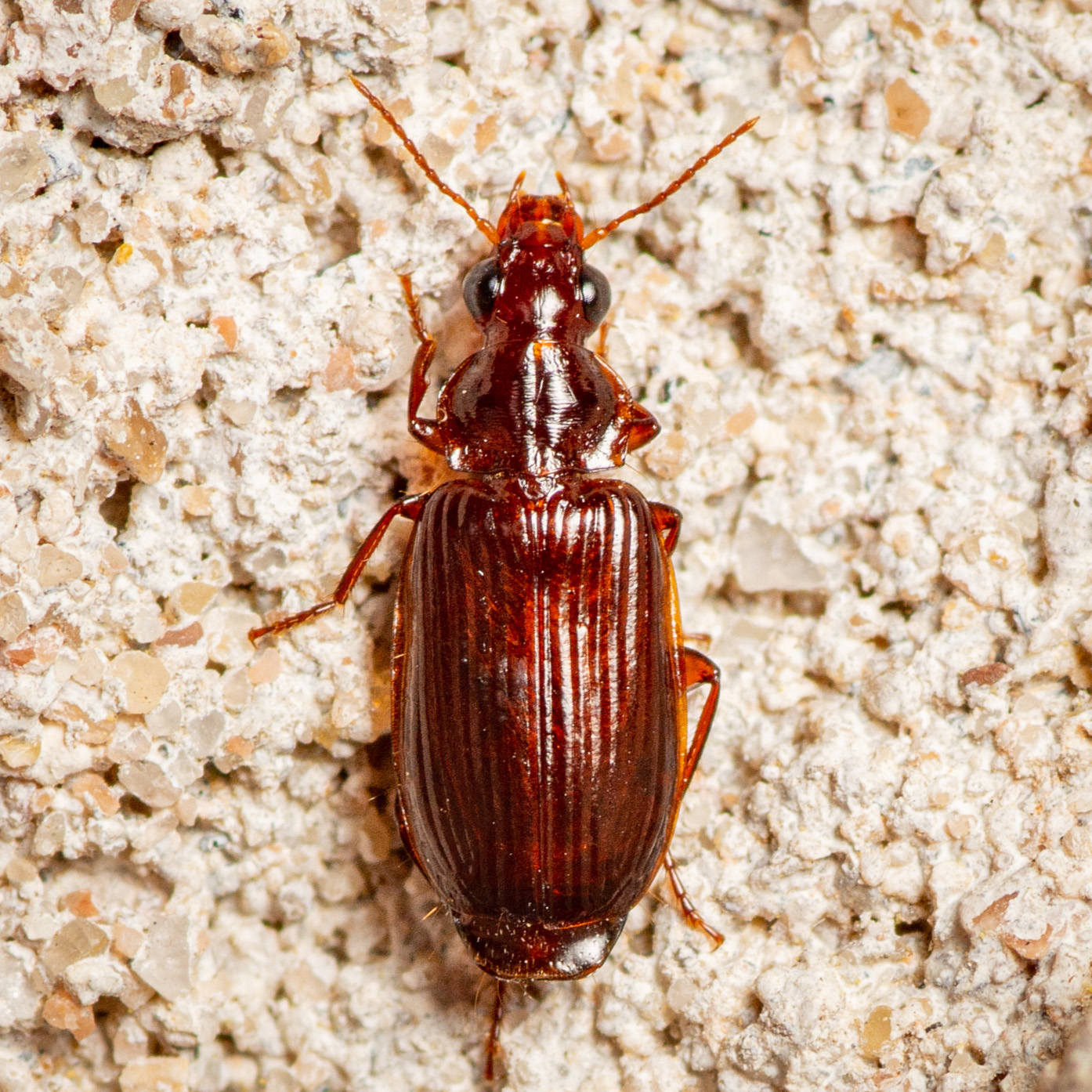

Scientific classification
- Domain: Eukaryota
- Kingdom: Animalia
- Phylum: Arthropoda
- Class: Insecta
- Order: Coleoptera
- Suborder: Adephaga
- Family: Carabidae
- Genus: Plochionus
- Species: P. timidus

Binomial name
- Plochionus timidus Haldeman, 1843

= Plochionus timidus =

Species of beetle

Plochionus timidus is a species of ground beetle in the family Carabidae. It is found in North America.
