= Beulah Garner =

British entomologist

Beulah Garner FRES
- Education: University of East Anglia (BSc, MA)
- Scientific career
- Workplaces: Rothamsted Research, Horniman Museum, Natural History Museum, London
- Doctoral advisor: Alfried Vogler, Terry Erwin

Beulah Garner FRES is an entomologist in the United Kingdom. She is Senior Curator at the Natural History Museum, London and is an expert of beetles, in particular the ground beetles (Carabidae).

== Education and career ==
Garner grew up in Norfolk and was educated at the University of East Anglia where she graduated with a BSc in ecology in 1998. She worked at Rothamsted Research as a Senior Scientific Officer, before studying an MA in Museology back at UEA, graduating in 2008. During her Masters she worked as Assistant Curator at Norfolk Museums Service and then moved to the Horniman Museum, in 2010 she moved to the Natural History Museum, London where she is Senior curator of Carabidae, Cleroidea, Myxophaga and Archostemata.

== Research ==
Garner researched crop protection and biodiversity in agroecosystems during her time at Rothamsted. Her work included the two-spotted spider mite, Tetranychus urticae, aphid controls on sugar beet crops and she also was part of a large project looking at invertebrate responses to genetically modified herbicide-tolerant crops.

As a museum curator she has collaborated on many publications relating to specimens in the NHM collection, including a guide on how to conserve insect specimens affected by verdigris, a problematic substance that develops on entomological pins underneath specimens; checkered beetles and a review of the taxonomic history of pelidnotine scarabs. In 2019 she was involved in work to help automate the identification of insects using imaging, testing a convolutional neural network to classify images of insect specimens.

She co-edited the Royal Entomological Society identification handbook Coleoptera Larvae with Max Barclay in 2019, it details the morphology of beetle larvae in the British Isles and includes dichotomous keys to help identify the taxonomic family or subfamily of a larval specimen.

Garner's thesis is on the 'Systematics and biogeography of Lebiinae: Carabidae: Coleoptera' at Imperial College London and the Natural History Museum, in the lab of Alfried Vogler and she was also co-supervised by the late Terry Erwin. She has worked on a taxonomic revision of the Carabid beetle genus Plochionus, which are beetles that hunt tent-caterpillars, she has also been involved in re-finding the type specimens of Carabus pallens, and has helped to develop rapid biodiversity assessments of tropical rainforest canopy fogging samples, using imaging to identify morphospecies before molecular sequencing, resulting in a larger diversity of species in the Agra genus of Carabid beetles than previously recorded.

== Public activities ==
Garner is an advocate for the need for more women in entomology and support for them, particularly in countries with limited funding for science; in 2009 she was interviewed as part of a project about women in science by teacher and writer Alom Shaha. In 2014 she gave a talk for Ada Lovelace Day highlighting the victorian entomologist Evelyn Cheesman. She expanded on Cheesman's career in interviews for the NHM website and the Daily Telegraph; in 2015 she presented BBC Radio 4 programme on Cheesman, as part of the Natural History Heroes series. In 2019 she co-wrote a paper about Cheesman's career and contributions to science

In 2015 Garner talked with David Baddiel on BBC Radio 4's Today programme about the type of insect that Gregor Samsa transforms into in Franz Kafka's 1915 novella Metamorphosis. Later in 2015 she was interviewed on the Breaking Bio podcast, where she talked about the NHM beetle collections, and challenges that women face doing fieldwork.

In 2021 she gave an online talk about Beetles as part of the NHM's Nature Live series.

== Honours and awards ==
Garner is a Trustee of the Panama Wildlife Conservation Charity, Council member of the Systematics Association, Fellow of the Royal Entomological Society, Chairperson of ColSoc: The Coleopterists Society of Britain and Ireland and President of the Amateur Entomologists' Society.
