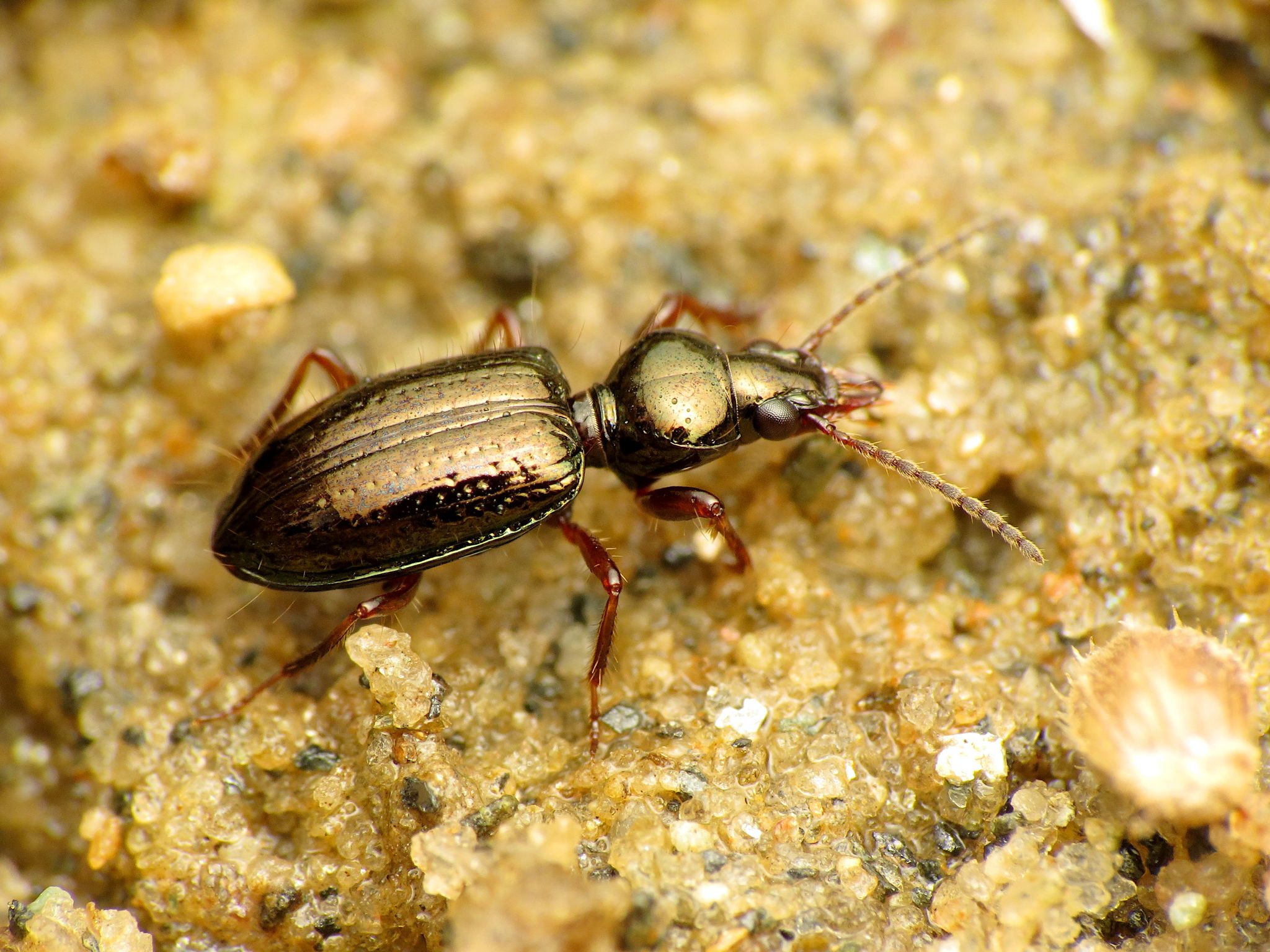

Scientific classification
- Kingdom: Animalia
- Phylum: Arthropoda
- Clade: Pancrustacea
- Class: Insecta
- Order: Coleoptera
- Suborder: Adephaga
- Family: Carabidae
- Genus: Semiardistomis
- Species: S. viridis

Binomial name
- Semiardistomis viridis (Say, 1823)

= Semiardistomis viridis =

Species of beetle

Semiardistomis viridis is a species of ground beetle in the family Carabidae. It is found in North America.
