= Roger Bate =

British educated economist

Roger Bate is a British educated economist who has held a variety of positions in free market oriented organizations. His work focuses on solving the problem of counterfeit and substandard medicines, particularly those in the developing world. He also works on US and international aid policy, performance of aid organisations, and health policy in developing countries, particularly with regard to malaria control and the use of DDT. He consulted for the tobacco industry in the mid-'90s, though the extent of this work is disputed. He was a fellow of the American Enterprise Institute and the Institute of Economic Affairs, and he was on the board of directors of Africa Fighting Malaria.

== Early life and education ==
Bate was a tennis coach from 1984 to 1986 and between 1986 and 1989 worked as a research analyst for Warburg Securities and Charles Stanley Stockbrokers. Bate attended Thames Valley University and 1n 1992 graduated with a BA in economics, then University College, London graduating with a MSc in Environmental Resource management in 1993. He studied economics at the University of Cambridge and in 1994 obtained an MPhil in land economy.

== Career ==
In 1993, Bate worked for the Institute of Economic Affairs, a British free market think tank, and founded the Environmental Unit. In 1994, he started the European Science and Environment Forum (ESEF).

In 1996, Bate approached R.J. Reynolds Tobacco Company for a grant of £50,000 to fund a book on risk, containing a chapter on passive smoking, (i.e. "second hand smoke") but the grant request was denied. According to internal industry documents the Tobacco Institute was nonetheless "involved in" the publication of the book. That same year he wrote the article "Is Nothing Worse Than Tobacco?" for The Wall Street Journal, and later ESEF published What Risk? Science, Politics and Public Health, edited by Bate, which included a chapter on passive smoking. After the publication of this chapter, according to Bate, he undertook a brief period consulting for the Philip Morris corporation, working for £800 per day. He then approached Philip Morris seeking funding for a project on DDT and malaria, as well as on the Montreal Protocol against climate change and its possible implications for the development of a similar protocol for the tobacco industry.

=== Genetic engineering ===
Bate is joint author, with Julian Morris of Fearing Food: Risk, Health and Environment, published by Butterworth-Heinemann in September 1999. The IEA website describes the book in the following way: "In the latest ESEF book, Fearing Food, new agricultural and food technologies, including genetic engineering, are shown to be generally beneficial both to health and to the environment." Bate was also a presenter on the BBC2 programme Organic Food: The Modern Myth.

=== Counterfeit drugs ===
Bate's work focuses on the prevalence of counterfeit anti-malarials and other pharmaceuticals in Africa and strategies by which rich and poor nations can work together to stop the trade of counterfeits. His original research has been published by the National Bureau of Economic Research, the Journal of Health Economics, and PLoS Medicine. AEI Press will publish his book Phake: The Deadly World of Falsified and Substandard Medicines in May 2011. The book explores the underground trade in illegal medicines, provides a firsthand account of the illegal industry, and offers academic and policy analysis. Prior to Phake, AEI Press published his book Making a Killing: The Deadly Implications of the Counterfeit Drug Trade in May 2008. In Making a Killing, Bate calls for stronger policing resources, harsher penalties for counterfeiters, widespread public education and consumer vigilance to deal with the proliferation of counterfeit drugs.

Bate distinguishes between approved generic drugs and what he calls "pseudo-generics." These are drugs approved as generic versions of proprietary drugs by bodies such as the World Health Organization and the Bill and Melinda Gates Foundation, but which, according to Bate, have not been adequately tested for efficacy.

== Funding ==
Bate's work has been funded by the Legatum Institute, which is affiliated with Legatum Capital. He has also received funding from Novartis.

== Positions held ==
- American Enterprise Institute, Resident Fellow
- Africa Fighting Malaria, co-director
- Institute of Economic Affairs, Director of Environmental Unit, 1993–2000; fellow, 2000–
- European Science and Environment Forum (ESEF), founder and executive director, 1995–2001
- International Policy Network, director, 2001–2003, Fellow 2003
- Sustainable Development Network, "Member"
- Competitive Enterprise Institute, Adjunct Fellow
- Committee for a Constructive Tomorrow, Advisory Board
- (stockbrokers), Research Analyst, 1986–1989
- Political Economy Research Center, Visiting Scholar
