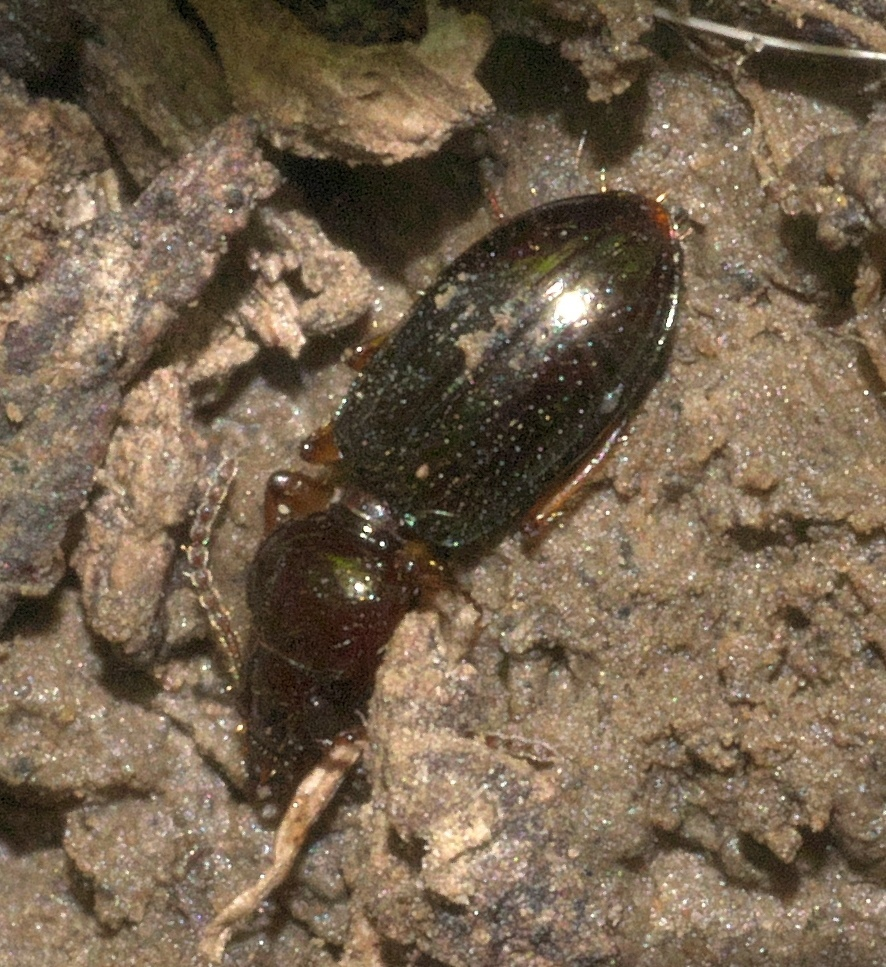
- Semiardistomis puncticollis, Oklahoma

Scientific classification
- Kingdom: Animalia
- Phylum: Arthropoda
- Class: Insecta
- Order: Coleoptera
- Suborder: Adephaga
- Family: Carabidae
- Genus: Semiardistomis
- Species: S. puncticollis

Binomial name
- Semiardistomis puncticollis (Dejean, 1831)

= Semiardistomis puncticollis =

Species of beetle

Semiardistomis puncticollis is a species of ground beetle in the family Carabidae. It is found in North America.
