= Coleopterology =

Branch of entomology studying beetles

Collection of beetles, labeled with the species name.

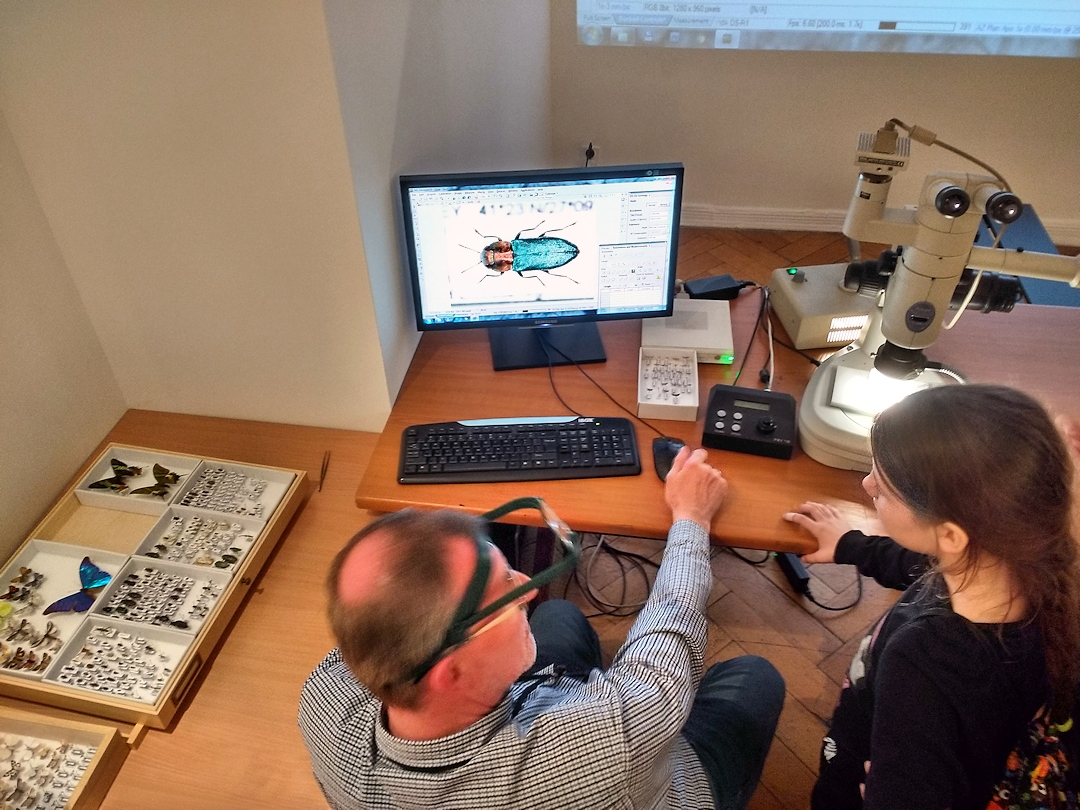
Entomologists studying a beetle with the help of a digital microscope.

Coleopterology is the branch of entomology that specifically studies the order Coleoptera (Beetles). Coleopterology seeks to understand the diet, lifecycle, biochemistry, genetics, population, impacts, conservation, and other aspects of beetle species.

Practitioners are termed coleopterists and form groups of amateurs and professionals, typically for professional, academic, or hobby purposes. Among these is The Coleopterists Society, an international organization based in the United States.

== Journals ==
Research in this field is often published in peer-reviewed journals specific to the field of coleopterology, though journals dealing with general entomology also publish many papers on various aspects of beetle biology. Some of the journals specific to beetle research are:

- The Coleopterist (United Kingdom beetle fauna)
- The Coleopterists Bulletin (published by The Coleopterists Society)
- Elytron (published by the European Association of Coleopterology)

== Famous coleopterists ==
- Charles Darwin
- Henry Walter Bates
- Alfred Russel Wallace
- George Robert Crotch
- Ross Taylor Bell
- Joyce Rockenbach Bell
- George Eugene Ball
- George Henry Horn
- John Lawrence LeConte
- Aleš Smetana
- Dr. Nithya Chandran

== Literature ==
- J. Cooter & M. V. L. Barclay, ed. (2006). A Coleopterist's Handbook. Amateur Entomological Society. ISBN 0-900054-70-0.
- E. Reitter, ed. (1908–1917). Fauna Germanica. The beetles of the German Reich. Stuttgart, K. G. Lutz, - 1916..
- A. Horion, ed. (1941–1974). faunistics the Central European beetles.
- H Joy; KW Harde; GA Lohse, eds. (1964–1983). The beetles of Central Europe Goecke & Evers, Krefeld. ISBN 3-334-61035-7..
- KW Harde, F. Severa: The Cosmos Beetle leader Franckh, Stuttgart, 1981. ISBN 3-440-04881-0 .
- Wolfgang Willner: Pocket Dictionary of beetles of Central Europe Source & Meier, Wiebelsheim 2013. ISBN 978-3-494-01451-7 .

== See also ==
- List of coleopterists
