= Elytron (journal) =

- Discipline: Entomology
- Language: English

Publication details
- History: 1987 to present
- Publisher: European Association of Coleopterology (Spain)

Standard abbreviations
- ISO 4: Elytron

Indexing
- ISSN: 0214-1353

Links
- Journal homepage

Elytron is a Spain-based journal for specialists in coleopterology (the study of beetles). It was first published in 1987. The last issue dates to 2016.
