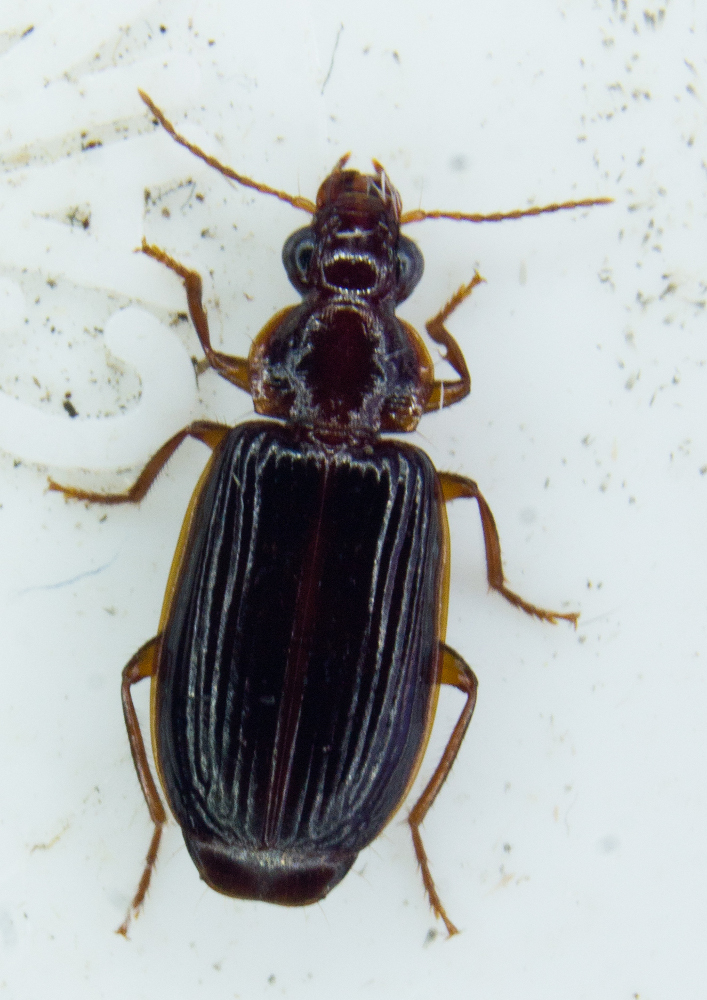
- Plochionus timidus, Illinois

Scientific classification
- Kingdom: Animalia
- Phylum: Arthropoda
- Class: Insecta
- Order: Coleoptera
- Suborder: Adephaga
- Family: Carabidae
- Subfamily: Lebiinae
- Tribe: Lebiini
- Subtribe: Calleidina
- Genus: Plochionus; Dejean, 1821

Subgenera
- Menidius Chaudoir, 1873; Plochionus Dejean, 1821

= Plochionus =

Genus of beetles

Plochionus is a genus in the beetle family Carabidae. There are about 18 described species in Plochionus.

== Species ==
These 18 species belong to the genus Plochionus:

- Plochionus amandus Newman, 1840 (United States)
- Plochionus bicolor Notman, 1919 (United States and Cuba)
- Plochionus circumseptus (Bates, 1883) (Guatemala)
- Plochionus discoideus LeConte, 1880 (United States)
- Plochionus faviger Chaudoir, 1873 (Colombia)
- Plochionus formosus (Bates, 1883) (Guatemala and Mexico)
- Plochionus gounellei Maindron, 1906 (Brazil)
- Plochionus incultus (Bates, 1883) (Guatemala)
- Plochionus monogrammus (Chaudoir, 1877) (Chile)
- Plochionus niger Fauvel, 1903 (New Caledonia)
- Plochionus pallens (Fabricius, 1775) (Europe, Asia, Africa, the Americas, Pacific islands)
- Plochionus pictipennis (Reiche, 1842) (Colombia)
- Plochionus pictus Chaudoir, 1873 (Colombia)
- Plochionus quadripustulatus (Dejean, 1825) (Brazil)
- Plochionus rufocruciatus Maindron, 1906 (Brazil)
- Plochionus timidus Haldeman, 1843 (United States and Canada)
- Plochionus vittula Csiki, 1932 (Costa Rica)
- † Plochionus lesquereuxi Scudder, 1900
