= The Coleopterist =

- Discipline: Entomology
- Language: English

Publication details
- History: 1992 to present
- Publisher: The Coleopterist (UK)

Standard abbreviations
- ISO 4: Coleopterist

Indexing
- ISSN: 0965-5794

Links
- Journal homepage; Journal homepage (Old); Downloads for back issues

The Coleopterist is a UK-based journal for specialists in coleopterology (the study of beetles). First published in March 1992, it is the successor to The Coleopterist's Newsletter, which was published from 1980 to 1991.
