= David Peakall =

David Beaumont Peakall (17 March 1931 – 18 August 2001) was an internationally recognised toxicologist. His research into the effects of DDE and DDT on eggshells contributed to the ban on DDT in the United States. He proved that the chemicals caused thinning of eggshells, leading to a reduction in the population of various bird species. He also pioneered research on the effects of PCBs on birds.

== Early years and studies ==
Peakall was born in Purley, Surrey, England and lived in Coulsdon, Surrey, as a boy. He demonstrated a keen interest in ornithology as well as chemistry, which led him to work as a volunteer at the RSPB reserve at Minsmere. He received a PhD in physical chemistry in 1956 from the University of London, and a D.Sc. from Oxford University in 1979 for his thesis on the ecological effects of pollutants. He became a member of the American Ornithologists' Union in 1961 and an Elective Member in 1972.

== Career ==
In 1960, Walter R. Spofford hired Peakall as a research associate in the Department of Anatomy of the Upstate Medical Center in Syracuse, New York, where he used egg albumen protein electrophoresis to determine phylogenetic relationships in the Falconiformes. In 1962, he was appointed assistant professor of Pharmacology. In 1968, he went to Cornell University as a research affiliate at the Laboratory of Ornithology and a senior research associate in the Section of Ecology and Systematics in the Biological Sciences Division. He initially worked on making the Laboratory of Ornithology's Nest Record Card Program accessible to researchers. He also worked to emphasise the importance of spatial and temporal data on bird nesting.

This led to Peakall working full-time on raptor pesticide problems, combining his passion for birds with his skills as a chemist. He measured DDE levels in peregrine eggs collected in Alaska from 1969 to 1973, and showed a strong inverse relationship between DDE content and eggshell thickness. The chemical industry claimed that shell thinning occurred too rapidly after the introduction of DDT in 1946 for DDT to be the cause. Peakall filled blown peregrine eggs collected from the critical period with solvent and measured DDE in the extracted lipids. DDE was present in sufficient concentrations to account for significant eggshell thinning in 1946 in Great Britain and as early as 1948 in California. Later, he would apply similar methods to California condor eggshell fragments as evidence that this species was extremely sensitive to DDE. His testimony at US congressional hearings contributed to the banning of DDT use in the United States. While at Cornell, Peakall also conducted studies on the ability of pesticides to induce breakdown of steroids, to alter vitamin D metabolism and calcium up-take, and on the role of carbonic anhydrase and calcium ATPase in eggshell thinning. He also pioneered research on the effects of PCBs on birds.

In 1975, Peakall went to Ottawa to become a research scientist and Chief of the Toxic Chemicals Division in the Canadian Wildlife Service (CWS) of Environment Canada. During his leadership, the contributions of the Division increased in magnitude and scope. To the existing strengths in analytical chemistry, field biology, pesticide registration and tissue banking, he added specialists in cytogenetics, heavy metals and biochemical toxicology, and a team to focus on the problems of fish-eating birds of the Great Lakes. He established an aviary and techniques to uncover the physiological mechanisms of pollutant effects observed in the field. He became an adjunct professor at the University of Ottawa.

Peakall's major contribution to the Great Lakes gull work was an egg swap programme between "clean" and "dirty" colonies, to isolate the effect of parental behaviour from that of embryo toxicity. He also participated in analysing the effects on songbirds of spraying New Brunswick forests, fostered the long-term monitoring of contaminant residues in seabird eggs, and for many years was key to the success of the Research Advisory Board of the WWF-CWS Wildlife Toxicology Fund. Peakall guided his scientific team in their collaborative investigations with CWS regional biologists on such problems as reproductive declines in falcons, effects of mercury and acid precipitation on loons and other waterfowl, and the effects of dioxins and dioxin-like compounds in pulp mill effluent on great blue heron reproduction. From 1979 to 1985, he conducted his own extensive collaborative research program on the sub-lethal effects of oil on seabirds, working at the Mount Desert Island Biological Lab in Maine and Memorial University in Newfoundland. He retired from CWS in 1991, moving to Wimbledon, England, a few miles from his childhood home.

== Retirement ==
In retirement, Peakall remained very active in the fields of toxicology and ornithology. For several years he was a visiting fellow at the University of Reading where he lectured in ecotoxicology, co-authored the textbook Principles of Ecotoxicology, and in 1992 became a founding coeditor of the journal Ecotoxicology. In 1996, he co-authored Beyond Silent Spring, and helped to organise a US Department of Energy-funded international workshop on "Nondestructive Biomarkers in Vertebrates." He organised at least two NATO-funded advanced workshops.

== Personal life ==
Peakall's interests included the study of spiders, cooking, literature, travel and art, and a love of cricket. He enjoyed birding and attending cricket matches; he was a lifelong Surrey supporter.

== Death ==
Peakall became ill in early August 2001. He died on 18 August 2001 in London.
