= Instituto de Estudos Empresariais =

Brazilian right wing business think tank

- Institute for Entrepreneurial Studies
- Abbreviation: IEE
- Formation: December 13, 1984; 41 years ago
- Founders: Group of 25 young entrepreneurs
- Type: Think tank
- Legal status: Nonprofit organization
- Purpose: Promote freedom, individual responsibility, respect for private property, and the rule of law
- Location: Porto Alegre, Brazil
- Region served: Brazil
- Fields: Politics
- Members: 200 (2019)
- President: Tiago Dinon Carpenedo
- Funding: Member contributions and donations from like minded businesses
- Website: www.iee.com.br

Instituto de Estudos Empresariais (IEE) (Institute for Entrepreneurial Studies) is a Brazilian non-profit organization that promotes a neoliberalism agenda and states that it is without any politically partisan commitments. It is funded through contributions by its members and companies that support its mission to build a freer and more prosperous society.

== History ==
In 1984, Brazil went through a historic process of political opening. Military leaders who had governed the country since 1964 gave way to re-democratization. Citizens and civil organizations pressed for a fast return to democracy and called for a new Constitutional Assembly to establish a new institutional order. Proposals from different perspectives were put forward, but leftist movements made their suggestions echo loudest.

At that time, a group of young businessmen in the city of Porto Alegre, who were pursuing their professional training and who did not agree with the ideological position that prevailed in the Brazilian political and business environment, decided to establish a study group, a place for debate and intellectual growth guided by values such as responsibility, property, freedom, order, justice, democracy, and a market economy. This is how IEE was established, with the mission of educating business leaders who are committed to a model of social and political organization based on the aforementioned values.

These young people called for re¬democratization as part of a broader argument in favor of economic open¬ness, the establishment of strong and adequate institutions, and a freer and more prosperous society. After many meetings to define how the institute would be organized, IEE’s founders concluded that the focus should be on the training and education of their own members, turning into an Academy, thereby creating leaders who would be intellectually prepared with broad social knowledge and strong ethical values to make a positive impact on society.

IEE members can be either permanent or honorary. Permanent members are young entrepreneurs aged 20 to 35 who identify with the values of the institute and who are being trained. Honorary members, having already been through the training cycle, counsel and support the training of those who are younger.

Four honorary members are also members of the Mont Pelerin Society.

== Objectives ==
The main goals of the institute are to analyze problems and issues facing society; discuss alternatives and suggestions to solve them; encourage the emergence and preparation of business leaders who are committed to advocating and preserving the market economy and free-enterprise values; foster the training of its members within the principles of good ethics; and to promote the relationship of its members with the cultural and economic segments of society.

Additionally, the Institute aims at developing its members six skills, deemed essential for the exercise of good leadership, namely: moral and ethical principles, foresight, vitality and motivation, ability to mobilize and achieve results, an extensive network of relationships, and communication skills.

The meetings are held every Monday night, when important entrepreneurs, politicians, economists, sociologists, philosophers, and historians are invited to address the members of the institute. Additionally, internal debates and presentations of books, weekend workshops are organized, and publication of books with papers are written by the members.

The main external activity of IEE is the Fórum da Liberdade (Liberty Forum). It is an important venue for debates held every year since 1988 and currently gathers around 6,000 people in two days to discuss subjects such as individual freedoms, property rights, respect for contracts, limitations of power, the institutional environment, and so on. Recognized in the Rio Grande do Sul State and all over Brazil for its size and ability to attract the elite of world thinkers, the Liberty Forum is one of the most significant meetings of liberal thought in the world.

== Awards ==
IEE was the recipient of the 2007 Templeton Freedom Award Grant from Atlas Economic Research Foundation at a public ceremony in April, during the 2007 Atlas Liberty Forum in Philadelphia, PA, USA.
