= Helmut Fritz van Emden =

British entomologist

Helmut van Emden (born 30 December 1933) is Emeritus Professor of Horticulture at the University of Reading. He is known for work on insect-plant interactions in agroecosystems. He was born in Dresden, Germany.

Van Emden is a former President and Honorary Fellow of the Royal Entomological Society and former President of the Association of Applied Biology.
