= International Policy Network =

Former neoliberal think tank

- Abbreviation: IPN
- Formation: 1971
- Founder: Sir Antony Fisher
- Dissolved: 2011
- Type: Non-partisan, non-profit think tank (UK charity)
- Legal status: Defunct
- Location: London
- Subsidiaries: The Freedom to Trade Campaign
- Formerly called: The International Institute for Economic Research; The Atlas Economic Research Foundation (UK)

The International Policy Network (IPN) was a neoliberal think tank based in the City of London, founded 1971, and closed in September 2011. The think tank said it was a non-partisan, non-profit organization, although critics argued that it was a "corporate-funded campaigning group". IPN ran campaigns on issues such as trade, development, healthcare and the environment. IPN's campaigns were pro-free market and in line with neoliberal policies, and also expressed climate change sceptic views.

== Vision ==
According to its website, "IPN aims to empower individuals and promote respect for people and property in order to eliminate poverty, improve human health and protect the environment. IPN promotes public awareness of the importance of this vision for all people, both rich and poor. IPN seeks to achieve its vision by promoting the role of market institutions in certain key international policy debates: sustainable development, health, and globalisation and trade. IPN works with academics, think tanks, journalists and policymakers on every continent."

== History ==
IPN was founded as a UK charity by Sir Antony Fisher in 1971. The mission of this body is to "Promote the advancement of learning by research into economic and political science and the publication of such research". The charity's original name was The International Institute for Economic Research, and The Atlas Economic Research Foundation (UK), but operated under the name International Policy Network. IPN's sister organization, International Policy Network US Inc., is a non-profit started in 2001.

== Funding ==
IPN was funded entirely by voluntary, charitable gifts from foundations, individuals and businesses. IPN did not receive any funding from governments or political parties, and it did no contract work. IPN developed and implemented a research and advocacy agenda that encompasses not one or a few, but many public policy issues. IPN has received grants totaling hundreds of thousands of pounds from the multinational energy company ExxonMobil, although it had not received money from the energy sector for some years.

== Programs ==
IPN undertook ongoing work on public policy in the areas of health, environment, economic development, trade, creativity and innovation. The Freedom to Trade Campaignis ran in collaboration with the Atlas Global Initiative. The campaign joined 73 think tanks in 48 countries to support free trade and oppose protectionism. IPN's Bastiat Prize for Journalism was founded in 2002 and is ongoing. The prize recognises and rewards journalists and commentators who support the free society. In 2009, IPN awarded the first Bastiat Prize for Online Journalism.

== Links to other organisations ==
- Institute of Economic Affairs
- Atlas Economic Research Foundation
- CriticalOpinion.org
- Electronic Journal of Sustainable Development

IPN was founded by Antony Fisher in the UK as the International Institute for Economic Research (IIER) in 1971. Fisher went on to set up a think tank creating other think tanks to promote neoliberalism, and founded the Atlas Economic Research Foundation in the US in 1981, and from this point the IIER traded as Atlas Foundation UK. This organisation underwent a further rebranding in 2001, when it changed its name to IPN. In the US, the Atlas Foundation also provides training and funding to start libertarian think tanks. Fisher founded the influential Institute of Economic Affairs (IEA), a neoliberal think tank based in London. The founding director of IPN, Julian Morris, was previously director of the IEA's Environment and Technology Programme.

== People ==
=== Past notable trustees/directors ===
- John Blundell

=== Past notable staff ===
- Julian Morris, executive director
- Roger Bate, director (left in 2003)

== Some of IPN's partners ==
- Institute of Public Policy Analysis, Nigeria
- Inter Region Economic Network, Kenya
- Free Market Foundation, South Africa
- Africa Resource Bank
- Action Research Community Health, India
- Institute of Public Affairs, Australia
- Making Our Economy Right, Bangladesh
- Association for Liberal Thinking (Liberal Düşünce Topluluğu), Turkey
- Timbro, Sweden
- Liberty Institute, India
- Centre for Civil Society, India
- Institute of Economic Affairs
- Montreal Economic Institute
- Centro de Divulgacion del Conocimiento Economico, Venezuela
- Libertad y Desarrollo, Chile
- Fundacion Libertad Democracia y Desarrollo, Bolivia
- Instituto de Libre Empresa, Peru
- The Lion Rock Institute, Hong Kong
- Instituto Liberdade, Brazil
