= Max Barclay =

British entomologist

Max Barclay FRES
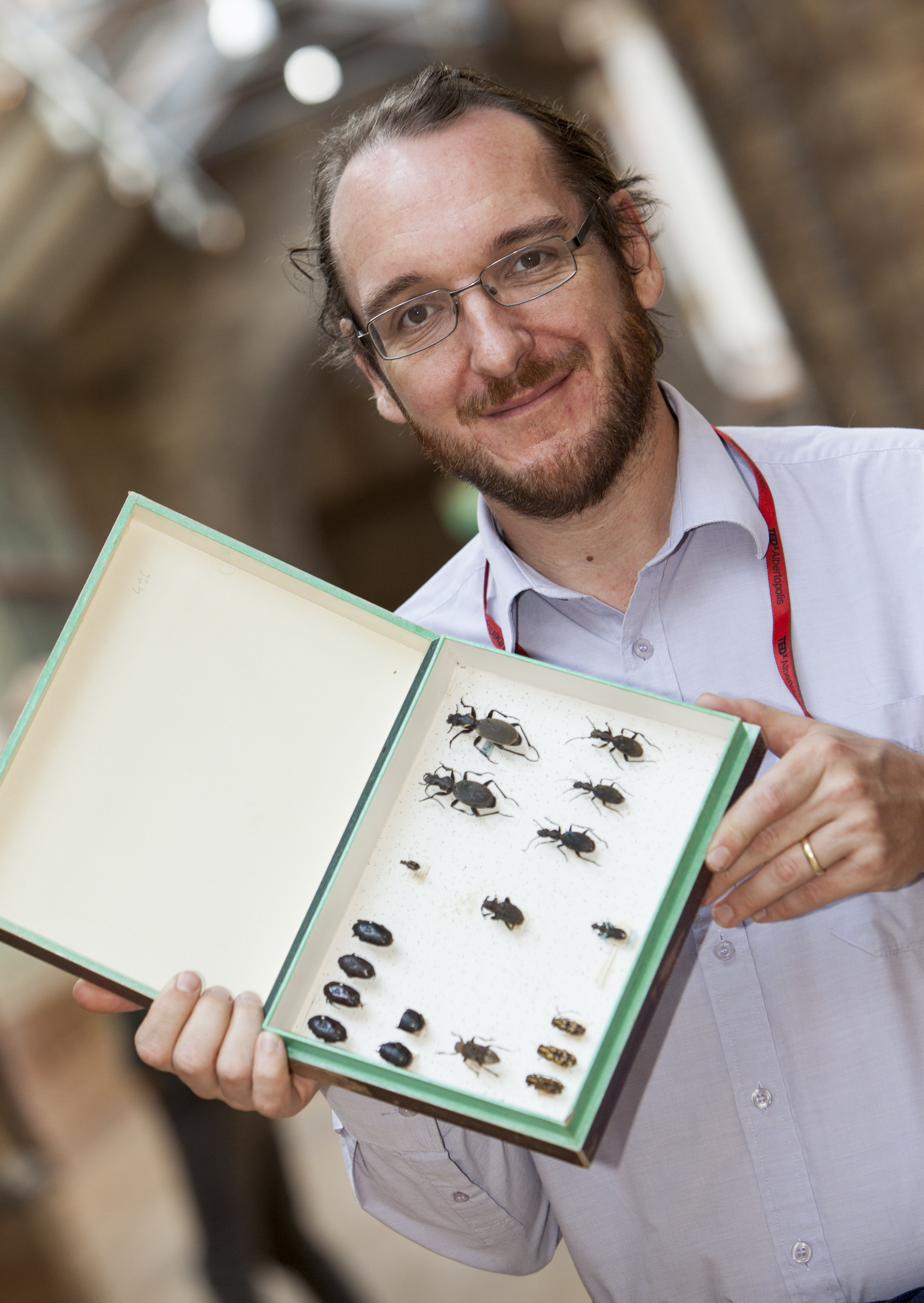
- Scientific career
- Fields: Entomology
- Workplaces: The Natural History Museum, London

Maxwell V L Barclay FRES is a British entomologist, and Curator and Collections Manager of Coleoptera and Hemiptera at the Natural History Museum in London. He is a Fellow of the Royal Entomological Society, and a member of the editorial board of The Coleopterist journal. He has been described as ‘one of Britain’s leading entomologists’.

== Career ==
Barclay is one of the four virtual ‘Scientist Guides’ of the Natural History Museum’s new Darwin Centre and was among the group that showed the building to Prince William at its 2009 opening. He is a frequent public speaker and media spokesman for entomology and the Museum, most notably appearing in three of the six episodes of the 2010 BBC Series Museum of Life presented by Jimmy Doherty. He believes that public speaking is important 'to enthuse the next generation of scientists and naturalists, and to legitimise what we do in the eyes of the public'. In 2016 he gave the Royal Entomological Society's Verrall Lecture speaking on 'Collections: the last great frontiers of exploration'. In 2008 he was involved in the identification of a species of bug new to Britain in the Museum’s garden.

Barclay is best known for his work on beetles (Coleoptera), and is author of scientific papers and co-editor of a text book on the subject. He worked as a volunteer in the Department of Entomology for several years before being offered the post of Curator in 2001. The collection of the Natural History Museum that he manages includes more than 20,000 drawers of beetles, including specimens collected by Joseph Banks, Charles Darwin and Alfred Russel Wallace. He has travelled extensively in search of specimens, including to Bolivia, Peru, Taiwan and Thailand, and has discovered new species.

== Recognition ==
110 beetle taxa have been named in his honour by fellow scientists, including:

Carabidae

- Goniotropis barclayi Deuve, 2005
- Platynus barclayi Schmidt, 2009
- Orictites barclayi Balkenohl, 2017
- Brachinus barclayi Hrdlička, 2019
- Rugiluclivina barclayi Bulirsch & Magrini, 2025

Hydrophilidae

- Berosus barclayi Ponomarenko & Soriano, 2019 (Upper Eocene fossil)

Ptiliidae

- Acrotrichis barclayi Darby, 2014

Staphylinidae

- Naddia barclayi Rougemont, 2016
- Asimos barclayi Chatzimanolis, 2023
- Loncovilius barclayi Reyes-Hernandez, Kappel Hansen, Jenkins Shaw & Solodovnikov, 2023
- Paraphloeostiba barclayi Shavrin, 2024
- Frischianus barclayi Frisch, 2025

Lucanidae

- Nigidius barclayi Bouyer, 2026

Scarabaeidae

- Ixorida (Pseudomecinonota) barclayi Legrand, 2008
- Gynaecoserica barclayi Ahrens, 2009
- Clinterocera barclayi Legrand & Chew, 2010
- Copris (Sinocopris) barclayi Ochi, 2010
- Protaetia (Macroprotaetia) maxwelli Jakl, 2011
- Madecorphnus barclayi Frolov, 2012
- Bietia barclayi Krajcik, 2012
- Onthophagus maxwellianus Moretto, 2013
- Mesomerodon barclayi Seidel, Jameson & Stone, 2017
- Parautoserica barclayi Lacroix, Coache & Filippi, 2023
- Rhyparus barclayi Ochi et al., 2019
- Rhyparus telnovietbarclayi Minkina & Jákl, 2024
- Wernoryctes barclayi Takano, 2020
- Bilga barclayi Lacroix, Coache & Filippi, 2023

Cantharidae

- Themus (Haplothemus) barclayi Svihla, 2006

Heteroceridae

- Tropicus maxwelli Skalicky, 2010

Limnichidae

- Phalacrichus max Ribera & Hernando, 2001

Throscidae

- Trixagus barclayi Kirejtshuk, 2019 (Upper Eocene fossil)

Eucnemidae

- Bioxylus barclayi Otto, 2016

Elateridae

- Athous barclayi Platia, 2010

Ptinidae

- Clada barclayi Zahradník & Trýzna, 2018

Dermestidae

- Orphinus barclayi Hava & Matsumoto, 2021
- Anthrenus barclayi Háva, 2019
- Thaumaglossa barclayi Kadej and Háva, 2015

Scirtidae

- Scirtes maxi Yoshitomi & Ruta, 2010
- Cyphon barclayi Yoshitomi, 2012

Psephenidae

- Falsodrupeus barclayi Lee, 2011
- Homoeogenus barclayi Lee, 2016

Buprestidae

- Endelus barclayi Kalashian, 2011
- Aphanisticus barclayi Kalashian & Kubáň, 2014
- Sphenoptera barclayi Kalashian, 2017
- Taphrocerus barclayi Marek, 2019

Lycidae

- Sulabanus barclayi Dvorak & Bocak, 2007
- Alyculus barclayi Palata & Bocak, 2012

Coccinellidae

- Serratibia barclayi Gordon, Canepari & Hanley, 2013

Helotidae

- Neohelota barclayi Lee, 2015

Nitidulidae

- Pocadius barclayi Cline, 2005

Laemophloeidae

- Charaphloeus barclayi Bremer, 2025

Latridiidae

- Cartodere barclayi Rücker, 2012

Aderidae

- Zarcosia barclayi Gompel, 2020

Anthicidae

- Tomoderus barclayi Telnov, 2005
- Macratria maxbarclayi Telnov, 2011

Ischaliidae

- Ischalia barclayi Young, 2011

Tenebrionidae

- Eurychora barclayi Ferrer, 2003
- Amarygmus barclayi Bremer, 2004
- Pseudopodhomala barclayi Medvedev, 2004
- Ulomina barclayi Grimm, 2004
- Enicmosoma barclayi Ferrer, 2005
- Tauroceras barclayi Ferrer, Soldati & Delatour, 2005
- Chariotheca barclayi Masumoto 2006
- Goniadera barclayi Ferrer, 2007
- Pseudonautes barclayi Ando, 2007
- Laena barclayi Schawaller, 2009
- Othryoneus barclayi Ferrer, 2010
- Phylan barclayi Ferrer, 2010
- Hexarhopalus (Leprocaulus) barclayi Purchart, 2010
- Phymatosoma barclayi Masumoto & Akita, 2010
- Blaps barclayi Martínez-Fernández & Ferrer, 2012
- Rhyzodina barclayi Ferrer, 2015
- Stenochinus barclayi Masumoto & Akita, 2019
- Borbonalia barclayi Masumoto, Novák, Akita & Lee, 2019
- Toktokkus barclayi Kamiński & Gearner, 2021

Oedemeridae

- Nacerdes (Xanthochroa) apicipennis barclayi Svihla, 2011

Cerambycidae

- Trypogeus barclayi Vives, 2007
- Melanesiandra barclayi Santos-Silva, 2011
- Acutandra barclayi Bouyer, Drumont & Santos-Silva, 2012
- Colobeutrypanus barclayi Monné & Monné, 2012
- Clytellus barclayi Miroshnikov, 2014
- Oncideres barclayi Nearns & Tavakilian, 2015
- Parandra barclayi Santos-Silva, 2015
- Triammatus barclayi Jiroux, 2016
- Saphanodes barclayi Adlbauer, 2016
- Elydnus barclayi Miroshnikov, 2017
- Lophobothea barclayi Monné M.A., Monné M.L. & Botero, 2017
- Dymasius barclayi Miroshnikov, 2018
- Polyzonus barclayi Skale, 2018
- Lingafelterellus barclayi Bezark & Santos-Silva, 2023

Chrysomelidae

- Cyrtonota maxhowardi Sekerka, 2011 (named for Max and his colleague Howard Mendel)
- Dercetina barclayi Lee & Bezdek, 2013
- Charaea maxbarclayi Bezdek & Lee, 2014
- Diabrotica barclayi Derunkov, Prado, Tishechkin & Konstantinov, 2015
- Doryscus barclayi Lee, 2017

Anthribidae

- Pseudobasidissus barclayi Tryzna & Banar, 2014
- Gymnognathus barclayi Perger & Guerra, 2016

Rhynchitidae

- Rubroinvolvulus barclayi Legalov, 2009

Brentidae

- Stereodermus barclayi Mantilleri, 2004
- Perapion barclayi Alonso-Zarazaga, 2011 [corrected 2013 from mistyped barkleyi]
- Werneradidactus barclayi Orbach & Bartolozzi, 2024

Curculionidae

- Maxwelleus Meregalli, 2022
- Barclayanthus Borovec & Skuhrovec, 2019
- Eudraces barclayi Borovec & Nakladal, 2018
- Heisonyx barclayi Borovec, Colonelli & Osella, 2009
- Larinus barclayi Gültekin & Lyal, 2016
- Pachycerus barclayi Meregalli, 2009
- Sphincticraerus barclayi Košťál, 2019
- Titilayo barclayi Cristovao & Lyal, 2018
- Tychius barclayi Caldara, 2011

as well as the wasp Platygaster barclayi Buhl, 2011, the fulgorid bug Polydictya barclayi Constant, 2016 and the fossil cockroach Mesoblatta maxi Hinkelman, 2020.

== Personal life ==
Barclay is married with children. As a teenager he worked as a volunteer at the Durrell Wildlife Park and he cites Gerald Durrell as a significant influence.
