= Julian Morris (economist) =

British economist

Julian Morris was formerly a Research Fellow and subsequently Director of the Environment and Technology Programme of the Institute of Economic Affairs. He is also a visiting professor of Economics at the University of Buckingham. Recently, he became co-editor with Indur M. Goklany of the Electronic Journal of Sustainable Development. Morris serves on the advisory board of the academic journal, Energy & Environment.

== Education ==
Morris received a MA, Economics from Edinburgh University in 1992, a MSc, Environment and Resource Economics, from University College London in 1993, a MPhil, Land Economics, from Cambridge University in 1995, and a Graduate Diploma, Law, from the University of Westminster in 1999.

== Publications ==
=== Books edited ===
- Okonski, K. and Morris, J. (ed) (2004): Environment and Health: Myths and Realities, London: International Policy Press.
- Morris J. (ed) (2002): Sustainable Development: Promoting Progress or Perpetuating Poverty, London: Profile Books.
- Morris, J. (ed.) (2000): Rethinking Risk and the Precautionary Principle, Oxford: Butterworth- Heinemann
- Morris, J. and Bate, R. (eds.) (1999): Fearing Food: Risk, Health and the Environment, Oxford: Butterworth-Heinemann
- Morris, J. (ed.) (1997): Climate Change: Challenging the Conventional Wisdom, London: Institute of Economic Affairs.

=== Journal articles ===
- Morris, J. (2021): ' A primer on carbon taxes' Reason Foundation
- Morris, J. (2008): 'When it comes to the sustainability of marine resources, institutions matter' Electronic Journal of Sustainable Development, Editorial, Vol. 1, Issue 2)
- Morris, J. (2003): ‘Climbing out of the Hole: Sunsets, Subjective Value, the Environment and English Common Law,’ Fordham Environmental Law Journal, Vol XIV, No. 2, pp. 343-
- Morris, J. (2002): ‘Insuring Against Negligence: Medical Indemnity in Australia’, Policy, Vol. 18, No.3, Spring, pp. 10–15.
- Morris, J. (2002): ‘Real Sustainability,’ IPA Review, Vol. 54, No. 3, September, pp. 14–16.
- Morris, J. (2002): ‘The Relationship between Risk Assessment and the Precautionary Principle,’ Toxicology, Vols. 181-182, pp. 127–130.
- Morris, J. (2002) ‘The Precautionary Principle and Biotechnology,’ Int. J. Biotechnology, Vol 4, No. 1, pp. 46–61.
- Morris, J. (2000): ‘Living in Virtual Reality,’ Economic Affairs 20 (1), March, pp. 2–4.
- Morris, J. (1998 : ‘Water and the Environment’, Economic Affairs, 18 (2), pp. 2-.
- Morris, J. (1996): 'Trade and the Environment', Economic Affairs, 16 (5), pp. 4–6.

=== Pamphlets ===
- Morris, J, Reekie, W.D, and Moffatt, R. (2001): Ideal Matter: Globalisation and the Intellectual Property Debate, New Delhi: Liberty Institute; republished in 2002: Brussels: Centre for the New Europe. 89 pp.
- Morris, J. (2000): E Future Not € Past, London: Business for Sterling. (not in WorldCat)
- Morris, J. (1997): ISO 14000: Regulation by Any Other Name? Washington DC: Competitive Enterprise Institute. (not in WorldCat)
- Morris, J. and Scarlett, L. (1996): Buying Green, Los Angeles: The Reason Foundation. 51 pp.
- Morris, J. (1997): Green Goods? Consumers, Product Labels and the Environment, London: IEA. 109 pp.
- Morris, J. (1995): The Political Economy of Land Degradation, London: Institute of Economic Affairs. 107 pp.
- Bate, R and Morris, J. (1994): Global Warming: Apocalypse of Hot Air, London: Institute of Economic Affairs. 54 pp.

=== Other publications ===
- Morris, J. (2002): "Coping with Change: Institutions for Human Habitation of Planet Earth", in Nature’s Revenge? Hurricanes, Floods and Climate Change, London: Hodder and Staughton.
- Morris, J. (1999): 'Law, Property Rights, Markets and the Environment,' included in a volume edited by Hannes Gissurarson, published by University of Iceland Press.
- Morris J. (1997): 'La propriete et les plantificateurs, ou comment l’Etat a detruit la campagne anglaise', in Falque et Massenet (ed.) Droits de propriete et environment, Paris: Dalloz.
