= European Science and Environment Forum =

The European Science and Environment Forum (ESEF), now defunct, called itself "an independent, non-profit-making alliance of scientists whose aim is to ensure that scientific debates are properly aired, and that decisions which are taken, and action that is proposed, are founded on sound scientific principles." Typically this manifested itself in questioning the science upon which environmental safety regulations are based.

The Forum was linked, via shared staff (Julian Morris and Roger Bate) and a shared web server, to the International Policy Network and the Sustainable Development Network. The most prominent academic members were US scientists known for denial of global warming and the relationship between Chloro Fluoro Carbon or CFCs and the ozone depletion.

In 1996, Roger Bate approached R.J. Reynolds Tobacco Company for a grant of £50,000 to fund a book on risk, containing a chapter on passive smoking , but the grant request was denied and the money was never received. In 1997, the ESEF published What Risk? Science, Politics and Public Health, edited by Roger Bate which included a chapter on passive smoking.

In 1998 the Academic Members of ESEF included Bruce Ames, Sallie Baliunas, Robert Balling, Jack Barrett, C.J.F. Böttcher, Peter Dietze, Tor Ragnar Gerholm, Gerhard Gerlich, Sherwood Idso, Helmut Metzner, Patrick J. Michaels, William Mitchell, Harry N.A. Priem, Michel Salomon, S. Fred Singer, Willie Soon, Wolfgang Thüne, and Gerd-Rainer Weber, while Richard S. Courtney and Michael Gough were Business Members.

== Funding ==
According to Bate, the "vast majority" of the organizations' funding came from the May and Stanley Smith Charitable Trust and the Marit and Hans Rausing Foundation.

== See also ==
Global warming denial
