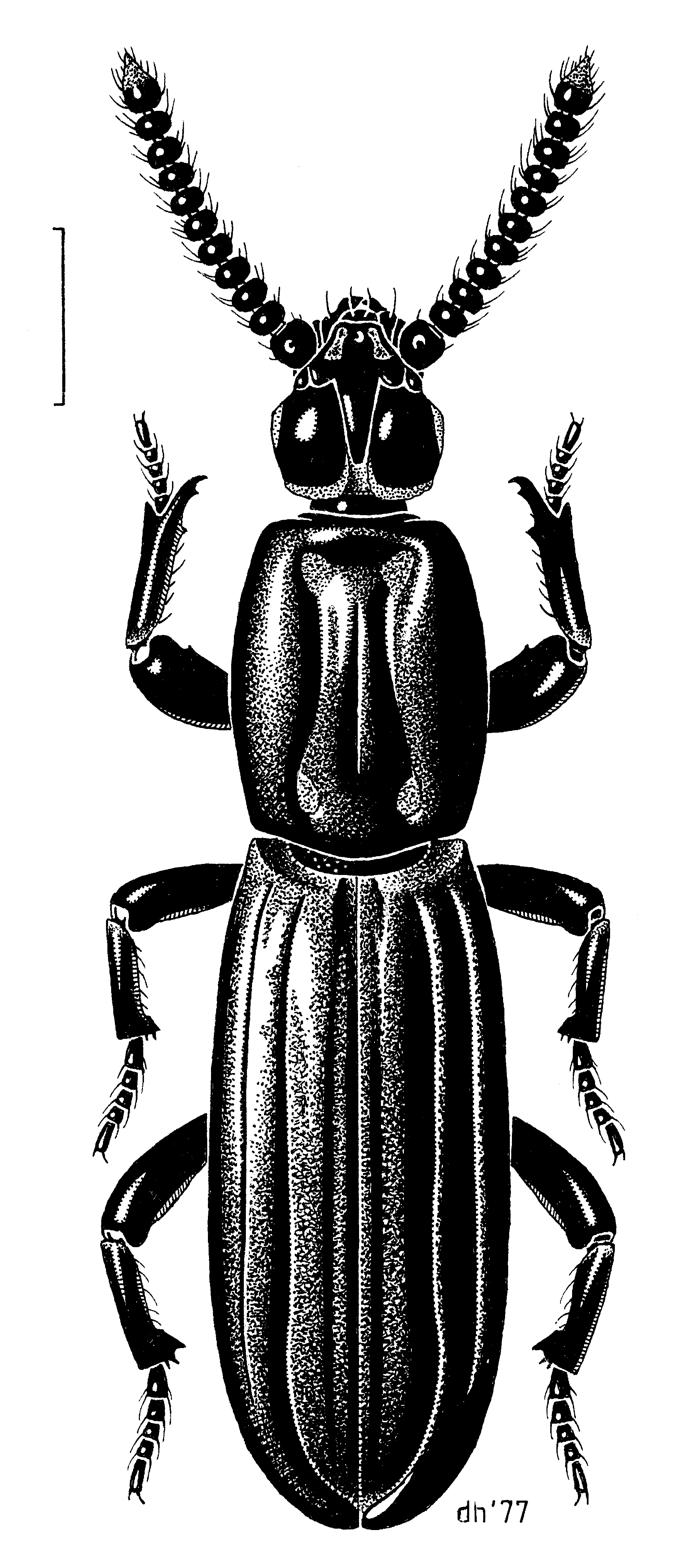

Scientific classification
- Kingdom: Animalia
- Phylum: Arthropoda
- Clade: Pancrustacea
- Class: Insecta
- Order: Coleoptera
- Suborder: Adephaga
- Family: Carabidae
- Genus: Rhyzodiastes
- Species: R. proprius

Binomial name
- Rhyzodiastes proprius (Broun, 1880)

Synonyms
- Rhysodes proprius Broun, 1880; Rhysodes probius Lewis, 1888 (error); Clinidium proprium (Broun, 1880)

= Rhyzodiastes proprius =

Species of beetle

Rhyzodiastes proprius is a species of ground beetle in the subfamily Rhysodinae. It was described by Thomas Broun in 1880. It is endemic to the North Island of New Zealand. Both the larvae and adults of this beetle live in rotting logs.

== Taxonomy ==
This species was first described by Thomas Broun and named Rhysodes proprius using specimens from Parua. In 1888, George Lewis, when referring to this species mistakenly named it as R. probius. This species was placed in the genus Rhyzodiastes in 1985.

== Description ==
Broun originally described this species as follows:

Elongate, sub-cylindrical, rather depressed, of a glossy reddish-black, with dark-red legs and antennae, and rufescent tarsi and palpi. Head rather small, having two inter-antennal punctiform impressions, and two oblique furrows proceeding from the antennae and becoming confluent in front of the base. Prothorax oblong, very slightly rounded laterally, its base almost rounded; two more or less curved broad grooves proceed from the base, where they are foveiform, and terminate near the apex in a large depression occupying the space between the sides, the intermediate dorsal space is indistinctly impressed longitudinally and depressed anteriorly. Elytra a little narrower than the thorax, with porrected tubercular shoulders, and a deep oblong scutellar depression; the sutural space is rather flattened and well limited by two broad grooves proceeding from the base and uniting at the apex, another similar furrow extends from each shoulder but does not attain the apex; otherwise they are without impressions of any kind.
Legs robust; the anterior tibiae of normal structure, the intermediate and posterior terminate inwardly in a large dentiform protuberance, below which the small spurs are inserted. Antenna sparsely pilose, with joints two to ten moniliform, the apical larger than tenth, oval and acuminate. In one specimen the third and fourth joints of the antennae coalesce, so as to form one large cylindrical articulation.

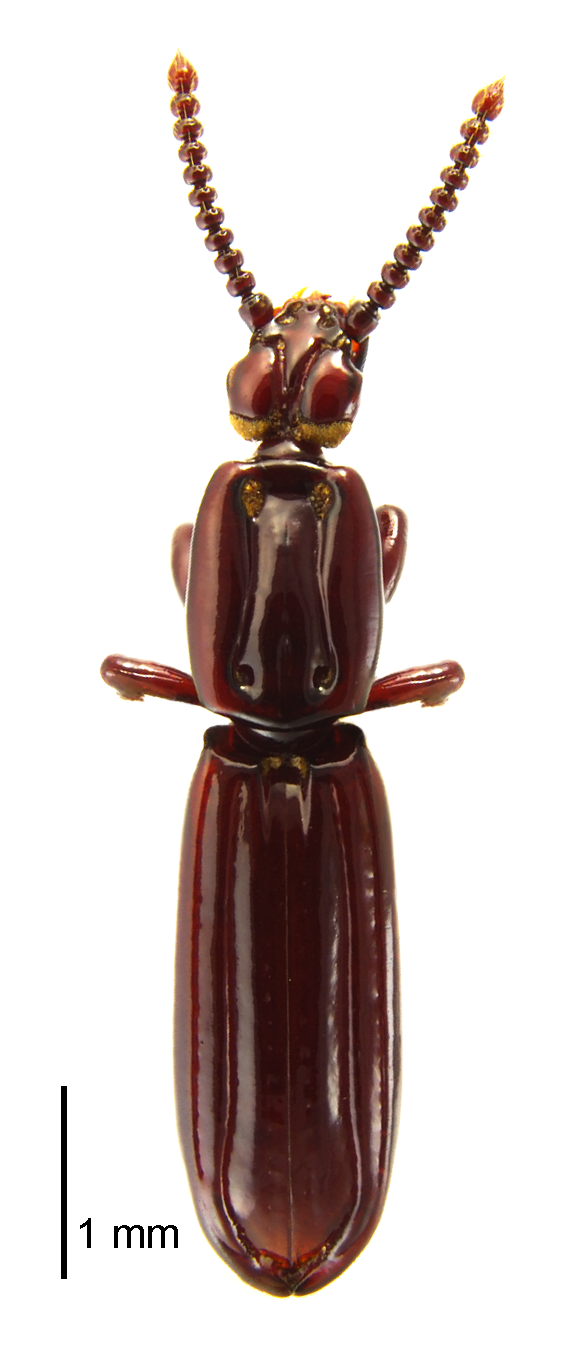
Rhyzodiastes proprius

Rhyzodiastes proprius measure 6–8 mm (0.24–0.31 in) in length.

== Distribution ==
This species is endemic to New Zealand and is only found in the North Island.

== Behaviour ==
The larvae and adults of this species live in rotting logs.
