= Rhyzodiastes costatus =

Scientific classification
- Kingdom: Animalia
- Phylum: Arthropoda
- Clade: Pancrustacea
- Class: Insecta
- Order: Coleoptera
- Suborder: Adephaga
- Family: Carabidae
- Genus: Rhyzodiastes
- Species: R. costatus

Binomial name
- Rhyzodiastes costatus (Chevrolat, 1829)

Species of beetle

Rhyzodiastes costatus is a species of ground beetle in the subfamily Rhysodinae, described by Louis Alexandre Auguste Chevrolat in 1829 from Brazil.
