= Rhyzodiastes sulcicollis =

Scientific classification
- Kingdom: Animalia
- Phylum: Arthropoda
- Clade: Pancrustacea
- Class: Insecta
- Order: Coleoptera
- Suborder: Adephaga
- Family: Carabidae
- Genus: Rhyzodiastes
- Species: R. sulcicollis

Binomial name
- Rhyzodiastes sulcicollis (Grouvelle, 1903)

Species of beetle

Rhyzodiastes sulcicollis is a species of ground beetle in the subfamily Rhysodinae. It was described by Antoine Henri Grouvelle in 1903. It is found in the central parts of the Caroline Islands, in the Chuuk and Yap states of the Federated States of Micronesia. Rhyzodiastes sulcicollis measure 4–6.5 mm (0.16–0.26 in) in length.
