= Rhyzodiastes spissicornis =

Scientific classification
- Kingdom: Animalia
- Phylum: Arthropoda
- Clade: Pancrustacea
- Class: Insecta
- Order: Coleoptera
- Suborder: Adephaga
- Family: Carabidae
- Genus: Rhyzodiastes
- Species: R. spissicornis

Binomial name
- Rhyzodiastes spissicornis (Fairmaire, 1895)

Species of beetle

Rhyzodiastes spissicornis is a species of ground beetle in the subfamily Rhysodinae. It was described by Léon Fairmaire in 1895. It is found on the Malay Peninsula (Malaysia).

This species is native to:

- Madagascar

No other species is listed as such.
