= Rhyzodiastes orestes =

Scientific classification
- Kingdom: Animalia
- Phylum: Arthropoda
- Clade: Pancrustacea
- Class: Insecta
- Order: Coleoptera
- Suborder: Adephaga
- Family: Carabidae
- Genus: Rhyzodiastes
- Species: R. orestes

Binomial name
- Rhyzodiastes orestes R.T. Bell & J.R. Bell, 2009

Species of beetle

Rhyzodiastes orestes is a species of ground beetle in the subfamily Rhysodinae. It was described by R.T. Bell and J.R. Bell in 2009. It is endemic to Tibet.

Rhyzodiastes orestes measures 5.9–6.2 mm (0.23–0.24 in) in length.
