= Kaveinga waai =

Scientific classification
- Domain: Eukaryota
- Kingdom: Animalia
- Phylum: Arthropoda
- Class: Insecta
- Order: Coleoptera
- Suborder: Adephaga
- Family: Carabidae
- Genus: Kaveinga
- Species: K. waai

Binomial name
- Kaveinga waai R.T. Bell & J.R. Bell, 2000

Species of beetle

Kaveinga waai is a species of ground beetle in the subfamily Rhysodinae. It was described by R.T. & J.R. Bell in 2000.
