= Rhyzodiastes liratus =

Scientific classification
- Kingdom: Animalia
- Phylum: Arthropoda
- Clade: Pancrustacea
- Class: Insecta
- Order: Coleoptera
- Suborder: Adephaga
- Family: Carabidae
- Genus: Rhyzodiastes
- Species: R. liratus

Binomial name
- Rhyzodiastes liratus (E. Newman, 1838)

Species of beetle

Rhyzodiastes liratus is a species of ground beetle in the subfamily Rhysodinae. It was described by Edward Newman in 1838. The lectotype was collected by Charles Darwin. It is endemic to the southeastern Brazil, between the stated of Bahia and São Paulo. Rhyzodiastes liratus measure 6.2–7.5 mm (0.24–0.30 in) in length.
