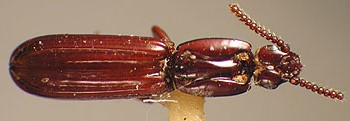
- Rhyzodiastes montrouzieri from Noumea, New Caledonia

Scientific classification
- Kingdom: Animalia
- Phylum: Arthropoda
- Clade: Pancrustacea
- Class: Insecta
- Order: Coleoptera
- Suborder: Adephaga
- Family: Carabidae
- Genus: Rhyzodiastes
- Species: R. montrouzieri

Binomial name
- Rhyzodiastes montrouzieri (Chevrolat, 1875)

= Rhyzodiastes montrouzieri =

Species of beetle

Rhyzodiastes montrouzieri is a species of ground beetle in the subfamily Rhysodinae. It was described by Louis Alexandre Auguste Chevrolat in 1875. It is endemic to New Caledonia. Rhyzodiastes montrouzieri measure 5–7.5 mm (0.20–0.30 in) in length.
