= Kaveinga setosa =

Scientific classification
- Domain: Eukaryota
- Kingdom: Animalia
- Phylum: Arthropoda
- Class: Insecta
- Order: Coleoptera
- Suborder: Adephaga
- Family: Carabidae
- Genus: Kaveinga
- Species: K. setosa

Binomial name
- Kaveinga setosa Grouvelle, 1903

Species of beetle

Kaveinga setosa is a species of ground beetle in the subfamily Rhysodinae. It was described by Grouvelle in 1903.
