= Arrowina =

Scientific classification
- Domain: Eukaryota
- Kingdom: Animalia
- Phylum: Arthropoda
- Class: Insecta
- Order: Coleoptera
- Suborder: Adephaga
- Family: Carabidae
- Subfamily: Rhysodinae
- Genus: Arrowina; R.T. Bell & J.R. Bell, 1978

Genus of beetles

Arrowina is a genus of wrinkled bark beetles in the family Carabidae. The genus occurs in Asia, with records from at least Sri Lanka, southern India, Nepal, Thailand, Sumatra (Indonesia), and Japan.

== Species ==
Arrowina contains the following species:

- Arrowina anguliceps (Arrow, 1901)
- Arrowina nan R.T. Bell & J.R. Bell, 2009
- Arrowina nilgiriensis (Arrow, 1942)
- Arrowina punctatolineata (Grouvelle, 1903)
- Arrowina pygmaea R.T. Bell & J.R.Bell, 1979
- Arrowina rostrata (Lewis, 1888)
- Arrowina taksar R.T. Bell & J.R. Bell, 2009
- Arrowina taprobanae (Fairmaire, 1873)
