= Kaveinga abbreviata =

- Kaveinga abbreviata, Upper Little Mulgrave River, Queensland, Australia

Scientific classification
- Domain: Eukaryota
- Kingdom: Animalia
- Phylum: Arthropoda
- Class: Insecta
- Order: Coleoptera
- Suborder: Adephaga
- Family: Carabidae
- Genus: Kaveinga
- Species: K. abbreviata

Binomial name
- Kaveinga abbreviata (Lea, 1904)

Species of beetle

Kaveinga abbreviata is a species of ground beetle in the subfamily Rhysodinae. It was described by Lea in 1904.
