= Rhyzodiastes singularis =

Scientific classification
- Kingdom: Animalia
- Phylum: Arthropoda
- Clade: Pancrustacea
- Class: Insecta
- Order: Coleoptera
- Suborder: Adephaga
- Family: Carabidae
- Genus: Rhyzodiastes
- Species: R. singularis

Binomial name
- Rhyzodiastes singularis (Heller, 1898)

Species of beetle

Rhyzodiastes singularis is a species of ground beetle in the subfamily Rhysodinae. It was described by Karl Borromaeus Maria Josef Heller in 1898. It is found on Sulawesi (Indonesia).
