= Kaveinga cylindrica =

Scientific classification
- Kingdom: Animalia
- Phylum: Arthropoda
- Class: Insecta
- Order: Coleoptera
- Suborder: Adephaga
- Family: Carabidae
- Genus: Kaveinga
- Species: K. cylindrica

Binomial name
- Kaveinga cylindrica (Arrow, 1942)

Species of beetle

Kaveinga cylindrica is a species of ground beetle in the subfamily Rhysodinae. It was described by Arrow in 1942.
