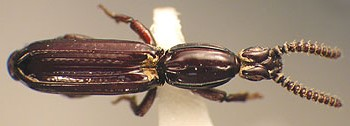

Scientific classification
- Kingdom: Animalia
- Phylum: Arthropoda
- Clade: Pancrustacea
- Class: Insecta
- Order: Coleoptera
- Suborder: Adephaga
- Family: Carabidae
- Genus: Rhyzodiastes
- Species: R. bifossulatus

Binomial name
- Rhyzodiastes bifossulatus (Grouvelle, 1903)

Synonyms
- Clinidium bifossulatum Grouvelle, 1903

= Rhyzodiastes bifossulatus =

Species of beetle

Rhyzodiastes bifossulatus is a species of ground beetle in the subfamily Rhysodinae. It was described by Antoine Henri Grouvelle in 1903. It is found in Borneo, with confirmed records from Sabah (Malaysia) and Indonesia.

Rhyzodiastes bifossulatus measure 6.7–8 mm (0.26–0.31 in) in length.
