= Rhyzodiastes polinosus =

Scientific classification
- Kingdom: Animalia
- Phylum: Arthropoda
- Clade: Pancrustacea
- Class: Insecta
- Order: Coleoptera
- Suborder: Adephaga
- Family: Carabidae
- Genus: Rhyzodiastes
- Species: R. polinosus

Binomial name
- Rhyzodiastes polinosus R.T. Bell & J.R. Bell, 1981

Species of beetle

Rhyzodiastes polinosus is a species of ground beetle in the subfamily Rhysodinae. It was described by R.T. & J.R. Bell in 1981. It is found in the Caroline Islands (Palau and the Federated States of Micronesia). Rhyzodiastes polinosus measure 5.1–7.8 mm (0.20–0.31 in) in length.
