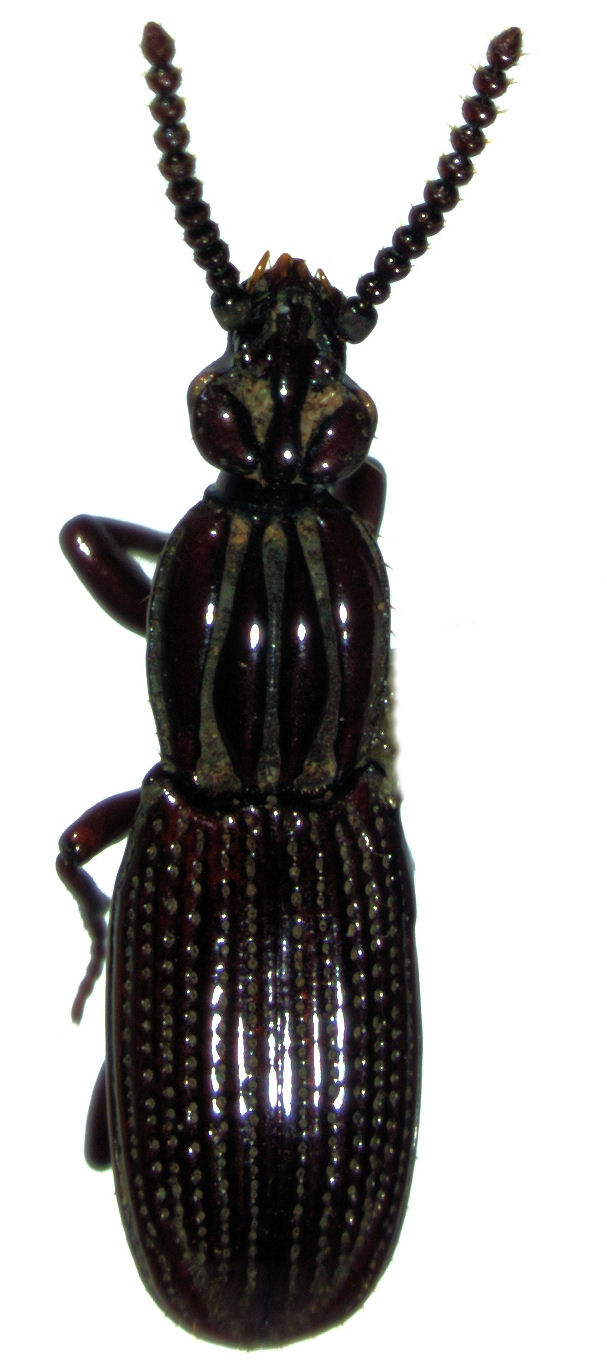
- Adult

Scientific classification
- Kingdom: Animalia
- Phylum: Arthropoda
- Class: Insecta
- Order: Coleoptera
- Suborder: Adephaga
- Family: Carabidae
- Genus: Kaveinga
- Species: K. lusca

Binomial name
- Kaveinga lusca (Chevrolat, 1875)

Synonyms
- Rhysodes luscus Chevrolat, 1875

= Kaveinga lusca =

Species of beetle

Kaveinga lusca is a species of ground beetle in the subfamily Rhysodinae. It was described by Louis Alexandre Auguste Chevrolat in 1875.
