= Rhyzodiastes waterhousii =

Scientific classification
- Kingdom: Animalia
- Phylum: Arthropoda
- Clade: Pancrustacea
- Class: Insecta
- Order: Coleoptera
- Suborder: Adephaga
- Family: Carabidae
- Genus: Rhyzodiastes
- Species: R. waterhousii

Binomial name
- Rhyzodiastes waterhousii (Grouvelle, 1910)

Species of beetle

Rhyzodiastes waterhousii is a species of ground beetle in the subfamily Rhysodinae. It was described by Antoine Henri Grouvelle in 1910. It is found in Myanmar.
