= Overgaard-Nielsen =

Overgaard-Nielsen is a surname. Notable people with the surname include:

- Christian Overgaard Nielsen (1918–1999), Danish zoologist and ecologist
- Henrik Overgaard-Nielsen (born 1959), Danish dentist and politician

== See also ==
- Nielsen (surname)
