= Kaveinga orbitosa =

Scientific classification
- Kingdom: Animalia
- Phylum: Arthropoda
- Class: Insecta
- Order: Coleoptera
- Suborder: Adephaga
- Family: Carabidae
- Genus: Kaveinga
- Species: K. orbitosa

Binomial name
- Kaveinga orbitosa (Broun, 1880)

Synonyms
- Rhysodes orbitosus Broun, 1880

Species of beetle

Kaveinga orbitosa is a species of ground beetle in the subfamily Rhysodinae. It was described by Thomas Broun in 1880 and originally named Rhysodes orbitosus.
