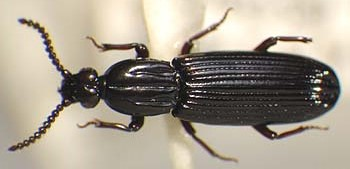
- Dhysores quadriimpressus

Scientific classification
- Domain: Eukaryota
- Kingdom: Animalia
- Phylum: Arthropoda
- Class: Insecta
- Order: Coleoptera
- Suborder: Adephaga
- Family: Carabidae
- Subfamily: Rhysodinae
- Genus: Dhysores; Grouvelle, 1903

= Dhysores =

Genus of beetles

Dhysores is a genus of beetles in the family Carabidae. It is confined to Africa.

== Species ==
There are seven species:

- Dhysores basilewskyi (Brinck, 1965)
- Dhysores biimpressus R.T. Bell & J.R. Bell, 1985
- Dhysores liber R.T. Bell & J.R. Bell, 1979
- Dhysores pan R.T. Bell & J.R. Bell, 1979
- Dhysores quadriimpressus (Grouvelle, 1910)
- Dhysores rhodesianus (Brinck, 1965)
- Dhysores thoreyi (Grouvelle, 1903)
