= Rhyzodiastes mirabilis =

Scientific classification
- Kingdom: Animalia
- Phylum: Arthropoda
- Clade: Pancrustacea
- Class: Insecta
- Order: Coleoptera
- Suborder: Adephaga
- Family: Carabidae
- Genus: Rhyzodiastes
- Species: R. mirabilis

Binomial name
- Rhyzodiastes mirabilis (Lea, 1904)

Species of beetle

Rhyzodiastes mirabilis is a species of ground beetle in the subfamily Rhysodinae. It was described by Arthur Mills Lea in 1904. It is found in Queensland (Australia).
