= Rhyzodiastes quadristriatus =

Scientific classification
- Kingdom: Animalia
- Phylum: Arthropoda
- Clade: Pancrustacea
- Class: Insecta
- Order: Coleoptera
- Suborder: Adephaga
- Family: Carabidae
- Genus: Rhyzodiastes
- Species: R. quadristriatus

Binomial name
- Rhyzodiastes quadristriatus (Chevrolat, 1873)

Species of beetle

Rhyzodiastes quadristriatus is a species of ground beetle in the subfamily Rhysodinae. It was described by Louis Alexandre Auguste Chevrolat in 1873. It is known from French Guiana.
