= Rhyzodiastes denticauda =

Scientific classification
- Kingdom: Animalia
- Phylum: Arthropoda
- Clade: Pancrustacea
- Class: Insecta
- Order: Coleoptera
- Suborder: Adephaga
- Family: Carabidae
- Genus: Rhyzodiastes
- Species: R. denticauda

Binomial name
- Rhyzodiastes denticauda R.T. Bell & J.R. Bell, 1985

Species of beetle

Rhyzodiastes denticauda is a species of ground beetle in the subfamily Rhysodinae. It was described by R.T. Bell and J.R. Bell in 1985. It is found in Sarawak (Malaysian Borneo).

Rhyzodiastes denticauda measure 6.8–7 mm (0.27–0.28 in) in length.
