= Rhyzodiastes ininius =

Scientific classification
- Kingdom: Animalia
- Phylum: Arthropoda
- Clade: Pancrustacea
- Class: Insecta
- Order: Coleoptera
- Suborder: Adephaga
- Family: Carabidae
- Genus: Rhyzodiastes
- Species: R. ininius

Binomial name
- Rhyzodiastes ininius R.T. Bell & J.R. Bell, 2009

Species of beetle

Rhyzodiastes ininius is a species of ground beetle in the subfamily Rhysodinae. It was described by R.T. Bell and J.R. Bell in 2009. It is known from French Guiana. Its specific name refers to Inini, the interior of French Guiana.

Rhyzodiastes ininius measure 6.1 mm (0.24 in) in length.
