= Yamatosa =

Scientific classification
- Domain: Eukaryota
- Kingdom: Animalia
- Phylum: Arthropoda
- Class: Insecta
- Order: Coleoptera
- Suborder: Adephaga
- Family: Carabidae
- Subfamily: Rhysodinae
- Genus: Yamatosa; R.T. Bell & J.R. Bell, 1979

Genus of beetles

Yamatosa is a genus of wrinkled bark beetles in the family Carabidae, found in Asia.

== Species ==
These 15 species belong to the genus Yamatosa:

- Yamatosa arrowi (Grouvelle, 1908)
- Yamatosa bacca R.T. Bell & J.R. Bell, 2011
- Yamatosa boysi (Arrow, 1901)
- Yamatosa draco (R.T. Bell, 1977)
- Yamatosa jakli Hovorka, 2010
- Yamatosa kabakovi R.T. Bell & J.R.Bell, 1985
- Yamatosa kryzhanovskyi R.T. Bell & J.R.Bell, 1985
- Yamatosa longior (Grouvelle, 1903)
- Yamatosa niponensis (Lewis, 1888)
- Yamatosa peninsularis (Arrow, 1942)
- Yamatosa phuka R.T. Bell & J.R.Bell, 2009
- Yamatosa reitteri (R.T. Bell, 1977)
- Yamatosa schawalleri R.T. Bell & J.R.Bell, 2002
- Yamatosa sinensis R.T. Bell & J.R.Bell, 1987
- Yamatosa smetanorum R.T. Bell & J.R.Bell, 1989
