= Rhyzodiastes raffrayi =

Scientific classification
- Kingdom: Animalia
- Phylum: Arthropoda
- Clade: Pancrustacea
- Class: Insecta
- Order: Coleoptera
- Suborder: Adephaga
- Family: Carabidae
- Genus: Rhyzodiastes
- Species: R. raffrayi

Binomial name
- Rhyzodiastes raffrayi Grouvelle, 1895

Species of beetle

Rhyzodiastes raffrayi is a species of ground beetle in the subfamily Rhysodinae. It was described by Antoine Henri Grouvelle in 1895. It is known from the holotype collected on Halmahera, in the Maluku Islands of Indonesia. The holotype measures 5.3 mm (0.21 in) in length.
