= Rhyzodiastes guineensis =

Scientific classification
- Kingdom: Animalia
- Phylum: Arthropoda
- Clade: Pancrustacea
- Class: Insecta
- Order: Coleoptera
- Suborder: Adephaga
- Family: Carabidae
- Genus: Rhyzodiastes
- Species: R. guineensis

Binomial name
- Rhyzodiastes guineensis (Grouvelle, 1903)

Species of beetle

Rhyzodiastes guineensis is a species of ground beetle in the subfamily Rhysodinae. It was described by Antoine Henri Grouvelle in 1903. It is found in New Guinea, with records from both Papua New Guinea (Fly River, Purari River) and Western New Guinea (Yos Sudarso Bay).
