= Rhyzodiastes mindoro =

Scientific classification
- Kingdom: Animalia
- Phylum: Arthropoda
- Clade: Pancrustacea
- Class: Insecta
- Order: Coleoptera
- Suborder: Adephaga
- Family: Carabidae
- Genus: Rhyzodiastes
- Species: R. mindoro

Binomial name
- Rhyzodiastes mindoro R.T. Bell & J.R. Bell, 2000

Species of beetle

Rhyzodiastes mindoro is a species of ground beetle in the subfamily Rhysodinae. It was described by R.T. & J.R. Bell in 2000.
