= Grouvellina planifrons =

Scientific classification
- Kingdom: Animalia
- Phylum: Arthropoda
- Class: Insecta
- Order: Coleoptera
- Suborder: Adephaga
- Family: Carabidae
- Genus: Grouvellina
- Species: G. planifrons

Binomial name
- Grouvellina planifrons (Fairmaire, 1893)

Species of beetle

Grouvellina planifrons is a species of ground beetle in the subfamily Rhysodinae. It was described by Fairmaire in 1893.
