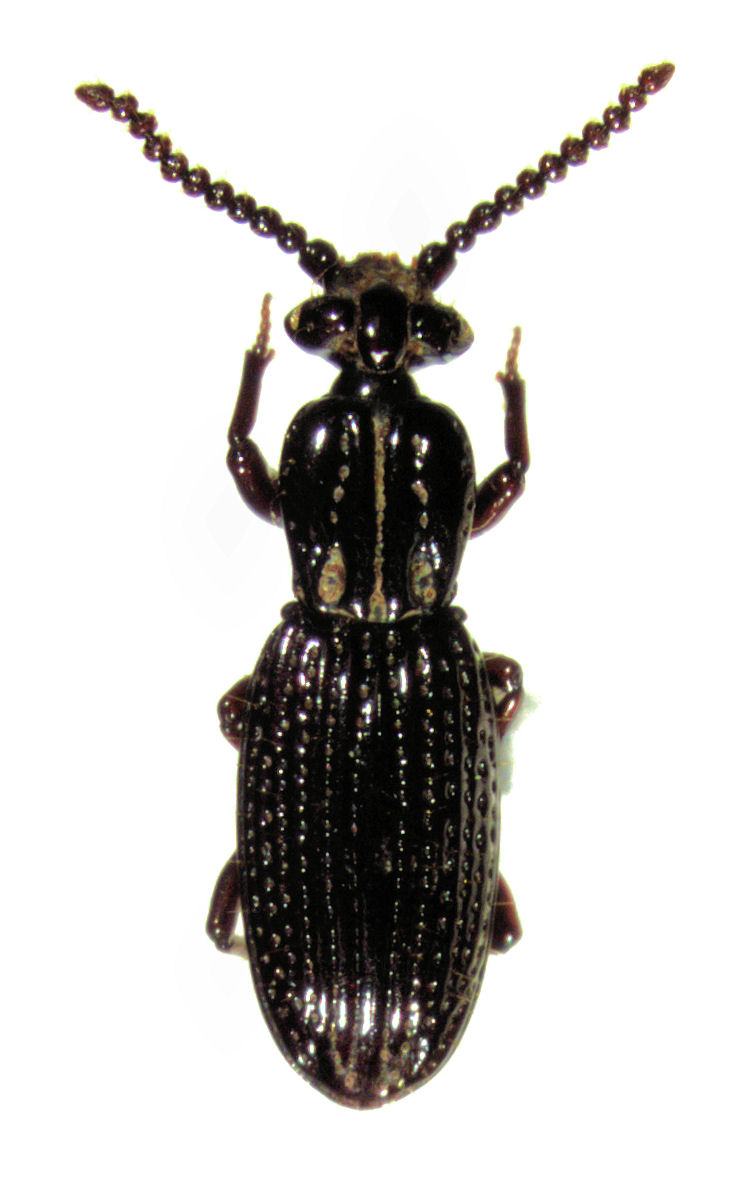

Scientific classification
- Kingdom: Animalia
- Phylum: Arthropoda
- Class: Insecta
- Order: Coleoptera
- Suborder: Adephaga
- Family: Carabidae
- Genus: Kaveinga
- Species: K. bellorum

Binomial name
- Kaveinga bellorum Emberson, 1995

= Kaveinga bellorum =

Species of beetle

Kaveinga bellorum is a species of ground beetle in the subfamily Rhysodinae. It was described by Rowan Mark Emberson in 1995.
