= Rhyzodiastes burnsi =

Scientific classification
- Kingdom: Animalia
- Phylum: Arthropoda
- Clade: Pancrustacea
- Class: Insecta
- Order: Coleoptera
- Suborder: Adephaga
- Family: Carabidae
- Genus: Rhyzodiastes
- Species: R. burnsi

Binomial name
- Rhyzodiastes burnsi (Charles G. Oke)

Species of beetle

Rhyzodiastes burnsi is a species of ground beetle in the subfamily Rhysodinae. It was described by Charles G. Oke in 1932, as Rhysodes burnsi. It is found in New South Wales in coastal zones The type locality is Mount Wilson, New South Wales. Rhyzodiastes burnsi measure 7 mm (0.28 in) in length.

This beetle is terrestrial and found on rotting wood in closed forests. Both adults and larvae are burrowers and feed on fungi.
