= Rhyzodiastes exsequiae =

Scientific classification
- Kingdom: Animalia
- Phylum: Arthropoda
- Clade: Pancrustacea
- Class: Insecta
- Order: Coleoptera
- Suborder: Adephaga
- Family: Carabidae
- Genus: Rhyzodiastes
- Species: R. exsequiae

Binomial name
- Rhyzodiastes exsequiae R.T. Bell & J.R. Bell, 2009

Species of beetle

Rhyzodiastes exsequiae is a species of ground beetle in the subfamily Rhysodinae. It was described by R.T. Bell and J.R. Bell in 2009. It is known from northwestern Amazonas State, Brazil, between the Venezuelan border and Rio Negro.

Rhyzodiastes exsequiae measures 6.1–6.3 mm (0.24–0.25 in) in length.
