= Kaveinga kukum =

Scientific classification
- Kingdom: Animalia
- Phylum: Arthropoda
- Clade: Pancrustacea
- Class: Insecta
- Order: Coleoptera
- Suborder: Adephaga
- Family: Carabidae
- Genus: Kaveinga
- Species: K. kukum

Binomial name
- Kaveinga kukum R.T. Bell & J.R. Bell, 1979

Species of beetle

Kaveinga kukum is a species of ground beetle in the subfamily Rhysodinae. It was described by R.T. & J.R. Bell in 1979.
