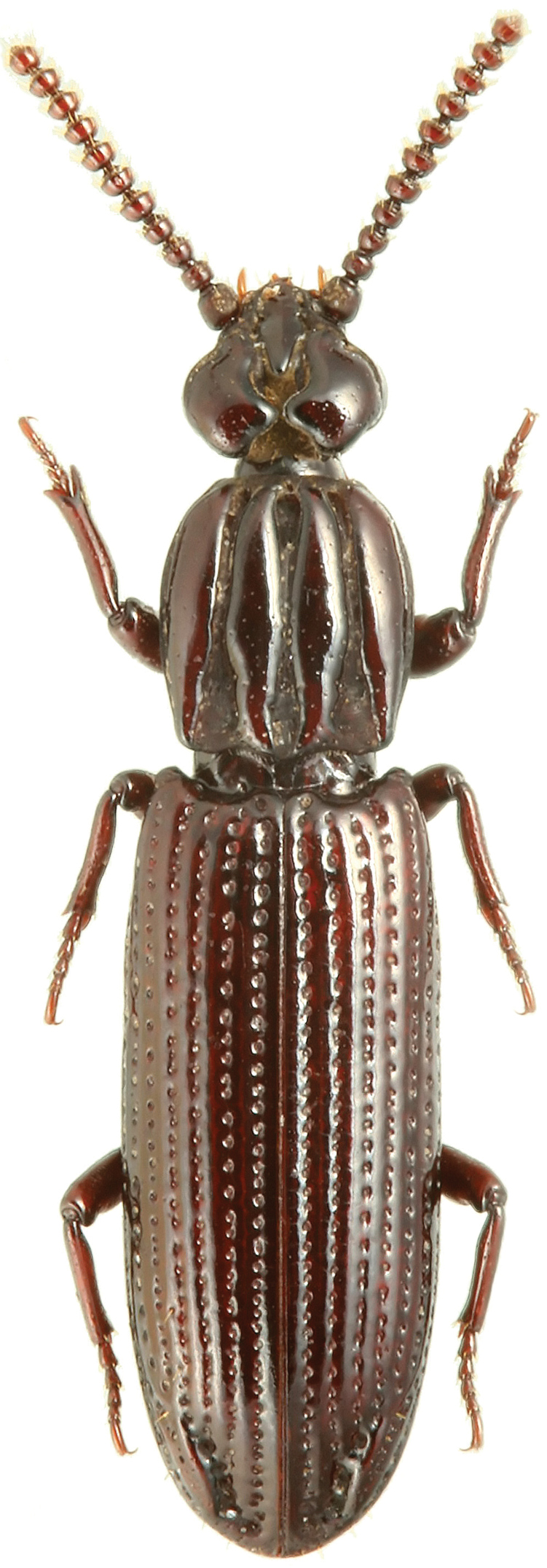

Scientific classification
- Kingdom: Animalia
- Phylum: Arthropoda
- Class: Insecta
- Order: Coleoptera
- Suborder: Adephaga
- Family: Carabidae
- Genus: Omoglymmius
- Species: O. americanus

Binomial name
- Omoglymmius americanus (Laporte, 1836)

= Omoglymmius americanus =

Species of carabid beetle

Omoglymmius americanus, the American crudely carved wrinkle beetle, is a species of ground beetle in the subfamily Rhysodidae native to eastern North America. It was originally described by Laporte as Rhysodes americanus in 1836. These reddish-brown beetles reach approximately 8 mm (0.31 in) in length with an elongated body. The pronotum has three grooves and the elytra have numerous indentations, formed in lines. Omoglymmius americanus occur in fungus-infested trees.
