= Rhyzodiastes xii =

Scientific classification
- Kingdom: Animalia
- Phylum: Arthropoda
- Clade: Pancrustacea
- Class: Insecta
- Order: Coleoptera
- Suborder: Adephaga
- Family: Carabidae
- Genus: Rhyzodiastes
- Species: R. xii

Binomial name
- Rhyzodiastes xii C. B. Wang, 2016

Species of beetle

Rhyzodiastes xii (Chinese: 习氏狼条脊甲), known alternatively as the Daddy Xi beetle (Chinese: 习大大甲虫), is a species of ground beetle that attracted media attention in 2016, when an entomologist named it after the paramount leader of China, Xi Jinping, who is the General Secretary of the Chinese Communist Party and President of China.

== Discovery ==
Cheng-Bin Wang, a Prague-based Chinese national, discovered the new beetle species on Hainan, a semi-tropical island off China's southern coast in the contentious South China Sea. The Rhyzodiastes (Temoana) xii, which can be loosely translated as 'Xi's Rhyzodiastes', lives in decaying logs in the rainforests of the Jianfeng mountain range.

Wang collected three samples, including one male found in rotten wood and another male pulled from cow dung. It is an example of a wrinkled bark beetle, which is part of the broader ground beetle family, which includes gas-emitting bombardier beetles.

== Naming ==
In an article published in the peer-reviewed taxonomy journal Zootaxa, Wang wrote that "…this specific epithet is dedicated to Dr. Xi Jinping, the President of China, for his leadership making our motherland stronger and stronger."

The entomologist also says that "The Rhyzodiastes (Temoana) is very rare – you might not encounter a single one even after 10 field collection sessions – and it also eats rotten wood for food… so it's a metaphor for Xi Jinping, a rare person you only encounter once a century, and specifically his controls on corruption [eating rot], which will allow Chinese corruption to gradually disappear".

Wang's description of the beetle included minute detail, including the 'lustrous' sheen of its body and 'genital segment… with handle moderately long and narrowly rounded at the tip'. He says that Xi's name has been presented respectfully, adding the Latin "i", to show a male possessive, resulting in "Xii".

== Censorship by Chinese authorities ==
Blocked Sina Weibo search for Xi Dada beetle.

Censors in China have clamped down on any online references to the new beetle species. Wang had not only named the beetle for paramount leader Xi, but also added the word "wolf" in Chinese: 习氏狼条脊甲 (literally, "Xi's wolf-stripe-spined beetle"). (Note: The term 狼条脊甲 has not seen publication before Wang's 2016 article, according to Google Scholar's limited indexing of Chinese literature. Wang used the term as the generic name for Rhyzodiastes, so that the part 习氏 corresponds to the specific epithet xii. The term has since been used for species beyond R. xii, such as for a 皮茨狼条脊甲 R. puetzi. The cockroach theory is likely incorrect, as Wang 2016 also names two parent taxa without 狼 "wolf": 斜条脊甲族 "oblique-stripe-spined beetle tribe" for Clinidiini and 条脊甲科 "stripe-spined beetle family" for Rhysodidae. Both taxa include beetles and not cockroaches.)

The beetle's name has been banned from China's social media platform Sina Weibo. A Weibo search resulted in a message saying: "due to relevant laws and policies, results for 'Xi Surnamed Wolf Spine Carapace' cannot be shown."

On 11 July 2016, a government censorship instruction was posted, saying: "All websites find and delete the article: Entomologists Report: Scholars Use 'Daddy Xi'[sic] to Name a New Type of Beetle, and related information". Nicknames for Xi Jinping include "Uncle Xi" (Xi Dàda 习大大). A number of related keywords were blocked on blogs, public accounts, forums and electronic message boards, including the terms: "Xi beetle", "Xi dung beetle", "Xi clan beetle", "Xi Dada beetle" and "Xi tiger".

Despite the attempts at censorship, many Chinese language reports were available outside the Great Firewall, so people within China could still access them by using virtual private networks (VPNs).

== Media coverage ==
Satirical image of the beetle from the Stand News (立場新聞)

Some in the media were sceptical about the reports, and one Chinese language site initially filed the story under its 'joke' section.

In Taiwan, columnist Daniel J. Bauer also initially dismissed the reports as a hoax. However, writing in The China Post, he went on to observe that the Communist Party could control many things, 'but not the naming of a new beetle', and that 'when a political system censors even the names of beetles, it reveals how weak it can sometimes be.'

The Hong Kong Free Press included satirical images of the beetle, and The Times suggested that Xi Jinping lacked a sense of humour. While Zhang Lifan, a Chinese writer and historian, responded to the beetle controversy with a poem in the style of Franz Kafka.

Responding to the censorship, entomologist Cheng-Bin Wang said his gesture had been 'deliberately vilified'. He was mortified that the naming had been taken as an insult, and stated that it had been intended as a 'tremendous honour'. Wang believes it is the first species to be named after a Chinese leader, saying: "As long as science exists, the name will forever exist. It's a very rare species of beetle, and I would certainly have appreciated it if someone had named it after me".

== See also ==
- List of organisms named after famous people (born 1950–1974)
- High-level black
