= Rhyzodiastes parumcostatus =

Scientific classification
- Kingdom: Animalia
- Phylum: Arthropoda
- Clade: Pancrustacea
- Class: Insecta
- Order: Coleoptera
- Suborder: Adephaga
- Family: Carabidae
- Genus: Rhyzodiastes
- Species: R. parumcostatus

Binomial name
- Rhyzodiastes parumcostatus (Fairmaire, 1868)

Species of beetle

Rhyzodiastes parumcostatus is a species of ground beetle in the subfamily Rhysodinae. It was described by Léon Fairmaire in 1868. It is found in Brazil and northern Argentina.
