= Rhyzodiastes myopicus =

Scientific classification
- Kingdom: Animalia
- Phylum: Arthropoda
- Clade: Pancrustacea
- Class: Insecta
- Order: Coleoptera
- Suborder: Adephaga
- Family: Carabidae
- Genus: Rhyzodiastes
- Species: R. myopicus

Binomial name
- Rhyzodiastes myopicus (Arrow, 1942)

Species of beetle

Rhyzodiastes myopicus is a species of ground beetle in the subfamily Rhysodinae. It was described by Gilbert John Arrow in 1942. It is found in the Malay Peninsula.
