= Rhyzodiastes fairmairei =

Scientific classification
- Kingdom: Animalia
- Phylum: Arthropoda
- Clade: Pancrustacea
- Class: Insecta
- Order: Coleoptera
- Suborder: Adephaga
- Family: Carabidae
- Genus: Rhyzodiastes
- Species: R. fairmairei

Binomial name
- Rhyzodiastes fairmairei (Grouvelle, 1895)

Species of beetle

Rhyzodiastes fairmairei is a species of ground beetle in the subfamily Rhysodinae. It was described by Antoine Henri Grouvelle in 1895. It is found in Myanmar.
