= Rhyzodiastes maritimus =

Scientific classification
- Kingdom: Animalia
- Phylum: Arthropoda
- Clade: Pancrustacea
- Class: Insecta
- Order: Coleoptera
- Suborder: Adephaga
- Family: Carabidae
- Genus: Rhyzodiastes
- Species: R. maritimus

Binomial name
- Rhyzodiastes maritimus R.T. Bell & J.R. Bell, 1981

Species of beetle

Rhyzodiastes maritimus is a species of ground beetle in the subfamily Rhysodinae. It was described by R.T. & J.R. Bell in 1981. It is endemic to the island of Kosrae in the east of the Federated States of Micronesia. Rhyzodiastes maritimus measure 4.3–6.2 mm (0.17–0.24 in) in length.
