= Rhyzodiastes ovicollis =

Scientific classification
- Kingdom: Animalia
- Phylum: Arthropoda
- Clade: Pancrustacea
- Class: Insecta
- Order: Coleoptera
- Suborder: Adephaga
- Family: Carabidae
- Genus: Rhyzodiastes
- Species: R. ovicollis

Binomial name
- Rhyzodiastes ovicollis R.T. Bell & J.R. Bell, 1992

Species of beetle

Rhyzodiastes ovicollis is a species of ground beetle in the subfamily Rhysodinae. It was described by R.T. & J.R. Bell in 1992.
