= Grouvellina radama =

Scientific classification
- Domain: Eukaryota
- Kingdom: Animalia
- Phylum: Arthropoda
- Class: Insecta
- Order: Coleoptera
- Suborder: Adephaga
- Family: Carabidae
- Genus: Grouvellina
- Species: G. radama

Binomial name
- Grouvellina radama R.T. Bell & J.R. Bell, 1979

Species of beetle

Grouvellina radama is a species of ground beetle in the subfamily Rhysodinae. It was described by R.T. & J.R. Bell in 1979. It is native to Madagascar and it is unknown whether it lives anywhere else.
