= Grouvellina grouvellei =

Scientific classification
- Kingdom: Animalia
- Phylum: Arthropoda
- Class: Insecta
- Order: Coleoptera
- Suborder: Adephaga
- Family: Carabidae
- Genus: Grouvellina
- Species: G. grouvellei

Binomial name
- Grouvellina grouvellei (Fairmaire, 1895)

Species of beetle

Grouvellina grouvellei is a species of ground beetle in the subfamily Rhysodinae. It was described by Fairmaire in 1895.
