= Bob Wong (ecologist) =

Australian biologist

Bob B.M. Wong is a Professor in the School of Biological Sciences at Monash University, Australia, and member of the Executive Council of the International Society for Behavioral Ecology (ISBE). He is a biologist and academic with his research focusing on the evolution of animal mating systems and behavior, and how investment in sex influences reproductive strategies and biological diversity. His current work focuses on the impacts of environmental change on animal behaviour and the evolutionary process. In 2019 he became a subject editor for Animal Behaviour and Oikos Journal. He was granted a Future Fellowship by the Australian Research Council and was Chair of the Organizing Committee for the 2024 Congress of the ISBE in Melbourne, Australia. He was awarded the 2024 Award for Excellence in Graduate Research Supervision by the Australian Council of Graduate Research (ACGR). He was born in Singapore and currently resides in Melbourne, Victoria.

Wong is publicly open about his identity as a gay man. In describing himself and his career, he has stated "As an academic of Asian heritage and a member of the LGBTQI+ community, I am a strong advocate for diversity in STEM."

Wong's research covers a range of animal species, from fish to invertebrates.

== Selected publications ==
- Brooker, Rohan M.; Wong, Bob B. M. (2 November 2020). "Non-visual camouflage". Current Biology. 30 (21): R1290 – R1292. Bibcode:2020CBio...30R1290B. doi:10.1016/j.cub.2020.08.001. ISSN 1879-0445. PMID 33142091. S2CID 226229586.
- Fisher, Heidi S; Wong, Bob B.M; Rosenthal, Gil G (22 May 2006). "Alteration of the chemical environment disrupts communication in a freshwater fish". Proceedings of the Royal Society B: Biological Sciences. 273 (1591): 1187–1193. doi:10.1098/rspb.2005.3406. PMC 1560282. PMID 16720390.
- Wong, Bob B. M.; Candolin, Ulrika (1 May 2015). "Behavioral responses to changing environments". Behavioral Ecology. 26 (3): 665–673. doi:10.1093/beheco/aru183. hdl:10.1093/beheco/aru183. ISSN 1045-2249.
