= Grouvellina canaliculata =

Scientific classification
- Domain: Eukaryota
- Kingdom: Animalia
- Phylum: Arthropoda
- Class: Insecta
- Order: Coleoptera
- Suborder: Adephaga
- Family: Carabidae
- Genus: Grouvellina
- Species: G. canaliculata

Binomial name
- Grouvellina canaliculata (Laporte, 1836)

Species of beetle

Grouvellina canaliculata is a species of ground beetle in the subfamily Rhysodinae. It was described by Laporte, Comte de Castelnau, in 1836.
