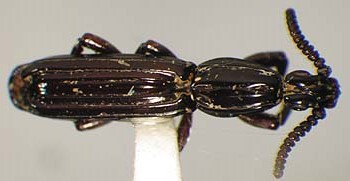
- Rhyzodiastes frater, Malaysia, Borneo, Sarawak, Third Division Upper Tiau River.

Scientific classification
- Kingdom: Animalia
- Phylum: Arthropoda
- Clade: Pancrustacea
- Class: Insecta
- Order: Coleoptera
- Suborder: Adephaga
- Family: Carabidae
- Genus: Rhyzodiastes
- Species: R. frater

Binomial name
- Rhyzodiastes frater (Grouvelle, 1903)

= Rhyzodiastes frater =

Species of beetle

Rhyzodiastes frater is a species of ground beetle in the subfamily Rhysodinae. It was described by Antoine Henri Grouvelle in 1903. It is found in Borneo, with records from both Sarawak (Malaysia) and Kalimantan (Indonesia).
