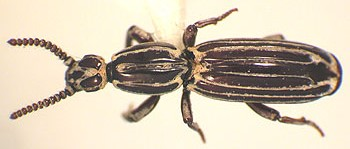
- Rhyzodiastes gestroi, Indonesia: Sumastras Westkust. Gunung Singgalang

Scientific classification
- Kingdom: Animalia
- Phylum: Arthropoda
- Clade: Pancrustacea
- Class: Insecta
- Order: Coleoptera
- Suborder: Adephaga
- Family: Carabidae
- Genus: Rhyzodiastes
- Species: R. gestroi

Binomial name
- Rhyzodiastes gestroi (Grouvelle, 1903)

= Rhyzodiastes gestroi =

Species of beetle

Rhyzodiastes gestroi is a species of ground beetle in the subfamily Rhysodinae. It was described by Antoine Henri Grouvelle in 1903. It is found on Sumatra (Indonesia).
