= Grouvellina tubericeps =

Scientific classification
- Domain: Eukaryota
- Kingdom: Animalia
- Phylum: Arthropoda
- Class: Insecta
- Order: Coleoptera
- Suborder: Adephaga
- Family: Carabidae
- Genus: Grouvellina
- Species: G. tubericeps

Binomial name
- Grouvellina tubericeps (Fairmaire, 1868)

Species of insect

Grouvellina tubericeps is a species of ground beetle in the subfamily Rhysodinae. It was described by Fairmaire in 1868.
