= Kaveinga strigiceps =

Scientific classification
- Domain: Eukaryota
- Kingdom: Animalia
- Phylum: Arthropoda
- Class: Insecta
- Order: Coleoptera
- Suborder: Adephaga
- Family: Carabidae
- Subfamily: Rhysodinae
- Genus: Kaveinga
- Species: K. strigiceps

Binomial name
- Kaveinga strigiceps R.T. Bell & J.R. Bell, 1979

Species of beetle

Kaveinga strigiceps is a species of ground beetle in the subfamily Rhysodinae, found in Indonesia. It was described by R.T. & J.R. Bell in 1979.
