= Enceladus (disambiguation) =

Enceladus is a moon of Saturn.

Enceladus may also refer to:

- Gaia Enceladus (or Enceladus Galaxy), the remains of a dwarf galaxy that merged with the Milky Way that was discovered by the Gaia space telescope
- Enceladus (giant), one of the Gigantes in Greek mythology
- Enceladus (son of Aegyptus), in Greek mythology
- USS Enceladus, an American cargo ship
- Enceladus Nunataks, Saturn Glacier, Alexander Island, Antarctica; the Enceladus ridge
- Enceladus (beetle), a genus of ground beetles in the family Carabidae
