= Kaveinga poggii =

Scientific classification
- Domain: Eukaryota
- Kingdom: Animalia
- Phylum: Arthropoda
- Class: Insecta
- Order: Coleoptera
- Suborder: Adephaga
- Family: Carabidae
- Genus: Kaveinga
- Species: K. poggii

Binomial name
- Kaveinga poggii R.T. Bell & J.R. Bell, 1985

Species of beetle

Kaveinga poggii is a species of ground beetle in the subfamily Rhysodinae. It was described by R.T. Bell and J.R. Bell in 1985. It is known from Goodenough Island (D'Entrecasteaux Islands, Papua New Guinea). It is named for Roberto Poggi from the Museo Civico di Storia Naturale di Genova.

Kaveinga poggii holotype, a male, measures 4.8 mm (0.19 in) in length.
