= Rhyzodiastes rimoganensis =

Scientific classification
- Kingdom: Animalia
- Phylum: Arthropoda
- Clade: Pancrustacea
- Class: Insecta
- Order: Coleoptera
- Suborder: Adephaga
- Family: Carabidae
- Genus: Rhyzodiastes
- Species: R. rimoganensis

Binomial name
- Rhyzodiastes rimoganensis (Miwa, 1934)

Synonyms
- Clynidium rimoganensis Miwa, 1934

Species of beetle

Rhyzodiastes rimoganensis is a species of ground beetle in the subfamily Rhysodinae. Described by Yoshiro Miwa in 1934, it measures 5.5–6.9 mm (0.22–0.27 in) in length and is endemic to Taiwan. The specific epithet rimoganensis is derived from Rimogan, the Japanese pronunciation of the Atayal settlement Lmuan in northern Taiwan.
