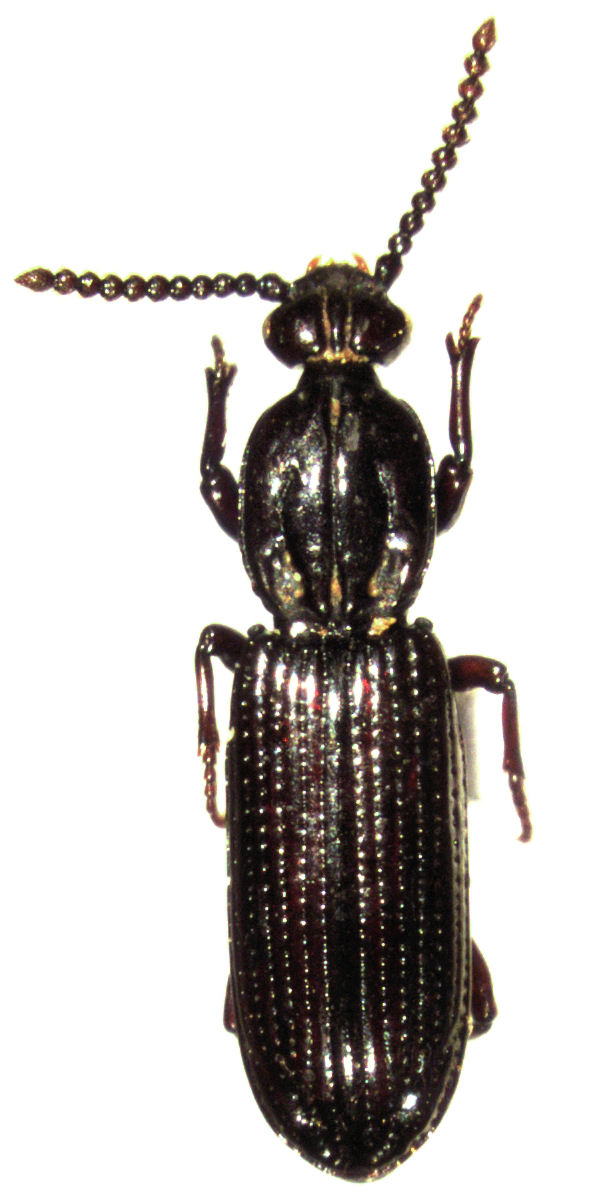
- Kupeus arcuatus

Scientific classification
- Domain: Eukaryota
- Kingdom: Animalia
- Phylum: Arthropoda
- Class: Insecta
- Order: Coleoptera
- Suborder: Adephaga
- Family: Carabidae
- Subfamily: Rhysodinae
- Genus: Kupeus; R.T. Bell & J.R. Bell, 1982
- Species: K. arcuatus

Binomial name
- Kupeus arcuatus (Chevrolat, 1873)

Synonyms
- Clinidium arcuatum Chevrolat, 1837

= Kupeus =

Genus of beetles

Kupeus is a genus of wrinkled bark beetles in the family Carabidae. Its only species is Kupeus arcuatus, endemic to New Zealand. K. arcuatus was originally described in 1873 by Louis Chevrolat.
