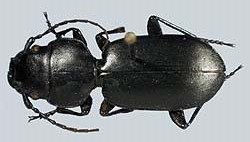
- Luperca laevigata

Scientific classification
- Domain: Eukaryota
- Kingdom: Animalia
- Phylum: Arthropoda
- Class: Insecta
- Order: Coleoptera
- Suborder: Adephaga
- Family: Carabidae
- Subfamily: Siagoninae
- Tribe: Siagonini
- Genus: Luperca; Laporte, 1840

= Luperca =

Genus of beetles

Luperca is a genus of ground beetles in the family Carabidae. There are at least two described species in Luperca.

== Species ==
These two species belong to the genus Luperca:

- Luperca goryi (Guérin-Méneville, 1838) (Africa)
- Luperca laevigata (Fabricius, 1781) (Bangladesh, India, and Pakistan)
