= Sloanoglymmius =

Scientific classification
- Domain: Eukaryota
- Kingdom: Animalia
- Phylum: Arthropoda
- Class: Insecta
- Order: Coleoptera
- Suborder: Adephaga
- Family: Carabidae
- Subfamily: Rhysodinae
- Genus: Sloanoglymmius; R.T. Bell & J.R. Bell, 1991

Species
- Sloanoglymmius planatus (Lea, 1904)

Genus of beetles

Sloanoglymmius is a genus of wrinkled bark beetles in the family Carabidae. Sloanoglymmius planatus, found in Australia, is the only species of this genus.
