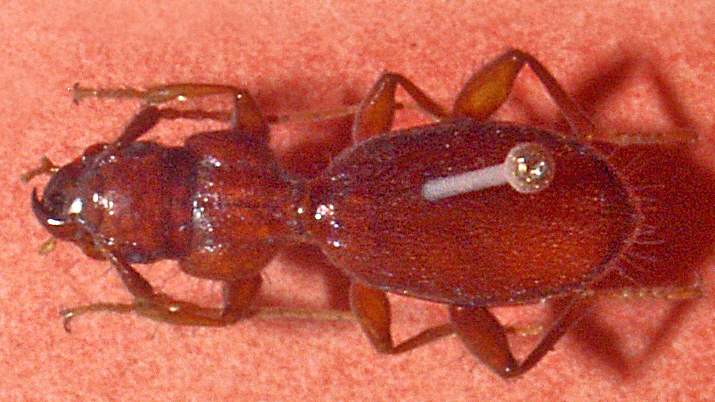
- Siagona jenissonii. Museum specimen

Scientific classification
- Kingdom: Animalia
- Phylum: Arthropoda
- Class: Insecta
- Order: Coleoptera
- Suborder: Adephaga
- Family: Carabidae
- Genus: Siagona
- Species: S. jenissonii

Binomial name
- Siagona jenissonii Dejean, 1826

= Siagona jenissonii =

Species of beetle

Siagona jenissonii is a species of beetles in the family Carabidae.

== Description ==
Siagona jenissonii can reach a length of 15–17 millimetres (0.59–0.67 in). Body is flat with a constriction between the prothorax and mesothorax. Pronotum is densely punctured. Mandibles are short and strong. Males have quite longer trochanters than females. This species is brachypterous.

== Biology ==
These carabids have a stenotopic lifestyle. They live in ground fissures and in darkness for most of their life. They are nocturnal hunters of ants.

== Distribution ==
This species is present in southern Spain, in Portugal and on the coast of Morocco.
