= Oikos (journal) =

- Discipline: Ecology
- Language: English
- Edited by: Pedro Peres-Neto, Paulo R. Guimarães Jr.

Publication details
- Former name(s): Acta Oecologica Scandinavica
- History: 1949–present
- Publisher: Wiley-Blackwell on behalf of the Nordic Society Oikos
- Frequency: Monthly
- Impact factor: 3.1 (2023)

Standard abbreviations
- ISO 4: Oikos

Indexing
- CODEN: OIKSAA
- ISSN: 0030-1299 (print); 1600-0706 (web)
- LCCN: 54028077
- JSTOR: 00301299
- OCLC no.: 01643453

Links
- Journal homepage; Online access; Online archive

Oikos is a monthly peer-reviewed scientific journal covering research in the field of ecology. It is published by Wiley-Blackwell on behalf of the Nordic Society Oikos.

== History ==
The journal was established in 1949 as Oikos: Acta Oecologica Scandinavica, together with the Nordic Society Oikos, to provide a vehicle for publishing in the growing field of ecology. The journal content would have no preference with regard to taxonomic group. In the 1970s, the scope was narrowed to studies with relevance to the progress of theory in ecology.

From 1949 to 1977, the journal appeared in one volume of three issues per year. From 1977 to 1987, two volumes per year were produced, and three volumes from 1987. In addition, from 1949 to 1975, a number of supplements were published at irregular intervals.

== Per Brinck Oikos Award ==
Between 2007 and 2014, the subject editors made nominations for an annual award given to a world-leading ecologist. The following persons have received this awards:

- 2008: Hal Caswell
- 2009: John Norton Thompson
- 2010: Hanna Kokko
- 2011: Michel Loreu
- 2012: Tim Coulson
- 2013: Sharon Strauss
- 2014: Robert D. Holt

=== Editors-in-chief ===
The following persons are or have been editor-in-chief:

- 2024–present: Pedro Peres-Neto, Concordia University, Canada and Paulo R. Guimarães Jr, University of Sāo Paulo, Brazil
- 2011–2024: Dries Bonte, Ghent University
- 2010–2011: Tim Benton, Leeds
- 2004–2010: Per Lundberg, Lund
- 1989–2004: Nils Malmer, Lund
- 1965–1989: Per Brinck, Lund
- 1949–1965: Christian Overgaard Nielsen, Copenhagen
