= Leoglymmius =

Scientific classification
- Kingdom: Animalia
- Phylum: Arthropoda
- Clade: Pancrustacea
- Class: Insecta
- Order: Coleoptera
- Suborder: Adephaga
- Family: Carabidae
- Subfamily: Rhysodinae
- Genus: Leoglymmius; R.T. Bell & J.R. Bell, 1978

Species
- Leoglymmius lignarius (Olliff, 1885)

Genus of beetles

Leoglymmius is a genus of wrinkled bark beetles in the family Carabidae. Its only species is Leoglymmius lignarius. It is endemic to Australia.
