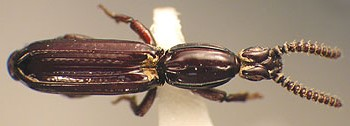
- Rhyzodiastes bifossulatus

Scientific classification
- Domain: Eukaryota
- Kingdom: Animalia
- Phylum: Arthropoda
- Class: Insecta
- Order: Coleoptera
- Suborder: Adephaga
- Family: Carabidae
- Subfamily: Rhysodinae
- Genus: Rhyzodiastes; Fairmaire, 1895

Synonyms
- Rhysodiastes Grouvelle, 1903; Rhyzoarca Bell & Bell, 1985; Rhyzostrix Bell & Bell, 1985; Rhyzotetrops Bell & Bell, 1985; Temoana Bell & Bell, 1985

= Rhyzodiastes =

Genus of beetles

Rhyzodiastes is a genus of beetles in the family Carabidae, containing the following species:

- Rhyzodiastes alveus R.T. Bell & J.R. Bell, 1985
- Rhyzodiastes bifossulatus (Grouvelle, 1903)
- Rhyzodiastes bipunctatus R.T. Bell & J.R. Bell, 1985
- Rhyzodiastes bonsae R.T. Bell & J.R. Bell, 1985
- Rhyzodiastes burnsi (Oke, 1932)
- Rhyzodiastes convergens R.T. Bell & J.R. Bell, 1985
- Rhyzodiastes costatus (Chevrolat, 1829)
- Rhyzodiastes davidsoni R.T. Bell & J.R. Bell, 1985
- Rhyzodiastes denticauda R.T. Bell & J.R. Bell, 1985
- Rhyzodiastes exsequiae R.T. Bell & J.R. Bell, 2009
- Rhyzodiastes fairmairei (Grouvelle, 1895)
- Rhyzodiastes fossatus R.T. Bell & J.R. Bell, 1985
- Rhyzodiastes frater (Grouvelle, 1903)
- Rhyzodiastes gestroi (Grouvelle, 1903)
- Rhyzodiastes guineensis (Grouvelle, 1903)
- Rhyzodiastes indigens R.T. Bell & J.R. Bell, 1985
- Rhyzodiastes ininius R.T. Bell & J.R. Bell, 2009
- Rhyzodiastes janus R.T. Bell & J.R. Bell, 1985
- Rhyzodiastes liratus (E. Newman, 1838)
- Rhyzodiastes maderiensis (Chevrolat, 1873)
- Rhyzodiastes maritimus R.T. Bell & J.R. Bell, 1981
- Rhyzodiastes menieri R.T. Bell & J.R. Bell, 1985
- Rhyzodiastes mindoro R.T. Bell & J.R. Bell, 2000
- Rhyzodiastes mirabilis (Lea, 1904)
- Rhyzodiastes mishmicus (Arrow, 1942)
- Rhyzodiastes montrouzieri Chevrolat, 1875
- Rhyzodiastes myopicus (Arrow, 1942)
- Rhyzodiastes nitidus R.T. Bell & J.R. Bell, 1985
- Rhyzodiastes orestes R.T. Bell & J.R. Bell, 2009
- Rhyzodiastes ovicollis R.T. Bell & J.R. Bell, 1992
- Rhyzodiastes parumcostatus (Fairmaire, 1868)
- Rhyzodiastes patruus R.T. Bell & J.R. Bell, 1985
- Rhyzodiastes pentacyclus R.T. Bell & J.R. Bell, 1985
- Rhyzodiastes polinosus R.T. Bell & J.R. Bell, 1981
- Rhyzodiastes preorbitalis R.T. Bell & J.R. Bell, 1985
- Rhyzodiastes propinquus R.T. Bell & J.R. Bell, 1985
- Rhyzodiastes proprius (Broun, 1880)
- Rhyzodiastes puetzi R.T. Bell & J.R. Bell, 2011
- Rhyzodiastes quadristriatus (Chevrolat, 1873)
- Rhyzodiastes raffrayi (Grouvelle, 1903)
- Rhyzodiastes riedeli R.T. Bell & J.R. Bell, 2000
- Rhyzodiastes rimoganensis (Miwa, 1934)
- Rhyzodiastes singularis (Heller, 1898)
- Rhyzodiastes spissicornis (Fairmaire, 1895)
- Rhyzodiastes sulcicollis (Grouvelle, 1903)
- Rhyzodiastes suturalis R.T. Bell & J.R. Bell, 1985
- Rhyzodiastes vadiceps R.T. Bell & J.R. Bell, 1985
- Rhyzodiastes waterhousii (Grouvelle, 1910)
- Rhyzodiastes xii C. B. Wang, 2016
