= Nils Malmer =

Per Nils Johan Alfred Malmer (25 May 1928 in Växjö – 17 April 2018) was a Swedish plant ecologist.

Malmer graduated (1957) and took his PhD (1962) in plant ecology (Studies on mire vegetation in the archaean area of southwestern Götaland (South Sweden)) at Lund University. He had then already been a research assistant in limnology 1948-1950, teaching assistant in systematic botany and plant ecology 1953-1959 and assistant professor of plant ecology 1959-1963. From 1963-1993, he was professor of plant ecology at Lund University.

He was Editor-in-Chief of the scientific journal Oikos 1989-2004. He served as vicedean at the Faculty of Science at Lund University 1974-1989. He is a member of the Royal Swedish Academy of Sciences (member number 1255).

His research has focused on carbon cycling in boreal and Arctic peatland. This research has included studies of past and present productivity and decay losses in Sphagnum-dominated mires.

He died on 17 April 2018, aged 89.

== Sources ==
- Vem Är Vem - Skåne, Halland, Blekinge (ed. Åke Davidsson), 2nd edn. Bokförlaget Vem är vem, Stockholm, 1966; p. 542-543
