= Shyrodes =

Scientific classification
- Domain: Eukaryota
- Kingdom: Animalia
- Phylum: Arthropoda
- Class: Insecta
- Order: Coleoptera
- Suborder: Adephaga
- Family: Carabidae
- Subfamily: Rhysodinae
- Genus: Shyrodes; Grouvelle, 1903

Genus of beetles

Shyrodes is a genus of wrinkled bark beetles in the family of Carabidae. There are at least two described species in Shyrodes.

== Species ==
These two species belonging to the genus Shyrodes are:

- Shyrodes dohertyi (Grouvelle, 1903) (Myanmar)
- Shyrodes nakladali R.T. Bell & J.R. Bell, 2011 (China)
