= Grouvellina =

Scientific classification
- Domain: Eukaryota
- Kingdom: Animalia
- Phylum: Arthropoda
- Class: Insecta
- Order: Coleoptera
- Suborder: Adephaga
- Family: Carabidae
- Subfamily: Rhysodinae
- Genus: Grouvellina; R.T. Bell & J.R. Bell, 1978

Genus of beetles

Grouvellina is a genus in the beetle family Carabidae. There are more than 20 described species in Grouvellina, found in Madagascar.

== Species ==
These 24 species belong to the genus Grouvellina:

- Grouvellina bulirschi Hovorka, 2007
- Grouvellina canaliculata (Laporte, 1836)
- Grouvellina cinerea R.T. Bell & J.R. Bell, 1979
- Grouvellina cooperi R.T. & J.R.Bell, 1979
- Grouvellina cuneata R.T. & J.R.Bell, 1979
- Grouvellina dentipes R.T. & J.R.Bell, 1979
- Grouvellina descarpentriesi R.T. & J.R.Bell, 1979
- Grouvellina divergens R.T. & J.R.Bell, 1979
- Grouvellina edentata R.T. & J.R.Bell, 1979
- Grouvellina gigas R.T. & J.R.Bell, 1979
- Grouvellina grouvellei (Fairmaire, 1895)
- Grouvellina hexadon R.T. & J.R.Bell, 1985
- Grouvellina hova R.T. & J.R.Bell, 1979
- Grouvellina janaki Hovorka, 2007
- Grouvellina kmecoi Hovorka, 2016
- Grouvellina minor Hovorka, 2016
- Grouvellina montana R.T. & J.R.Bell, 1979
- Grouvellina moraveci Hovorka, 2009
- Grouvellina nzwani R.T. & J.R.Bell, 2011
- Grouvellina planifrons (Fairmaire, 1893)
- Grouvellina radama R.T. & J.R.Bell, 1979
- Grouvellina ranavalona R.T. & J.R.Bell, 1979
- Grouvellina ranomafana Hovorka, 2016
- Grouvellina tubericeps (Fairmaire, 1869)
