= Plesioglymmius =

Scientific classification
- Domain: Eukaryota
- Kingdom: Animalia
- Phylum: Arthropoda
- Class: Insecta
- Order: Coleoptera
- Suborder: Adephaga
- Family: Carabidae
- Subfamily: Rhysodinae
- Genus: Plesioglymmius; R.T. Bell & J.R. Bell, 1978

Subgenera
- Ameroglymmius R.T. & J.R.Bell, 1979; Juxtaglymmius R.T. & J.R.Bell, 1979; Plesioglymmius R.T. & J.R.Bell, 1978

Genus of beetles

Plesioglymmius is a genus of wrinkled bark beetles in the family Carabidae. Specimens of this genus are rare.

These species are members of Plesioglymmius:

- Plesioglymmius compactus R.T. Bell & J.R. Bell, 1979 (Cuba)
- Plesioglymmius elegans (Grouvelle, 1903) (Indonesia and Borneo)
- Plesioglymmius jugatus R.T. & J.R.Bell, 1979 (Indonesia)
- Plesioglymmius meridionalis (Grouvelle, 1903) (Brazil)
- Plesioglymmius moorei R.T. & J.R.Bell, 1987 (Indonesia)
- Plesioglymmius negara R.T. & J.R.Bell, 2000 (Malaysia)
- Plesioglymmius reichardti R.T. & J.R.Bell, 1979 (Venezuela)
- Plesioglymmius silus R.T. & J.R.Bell, 1979 (Philippines)
- † Plesioglymmius zayasi R.T. & J.R.Bell, 2009
