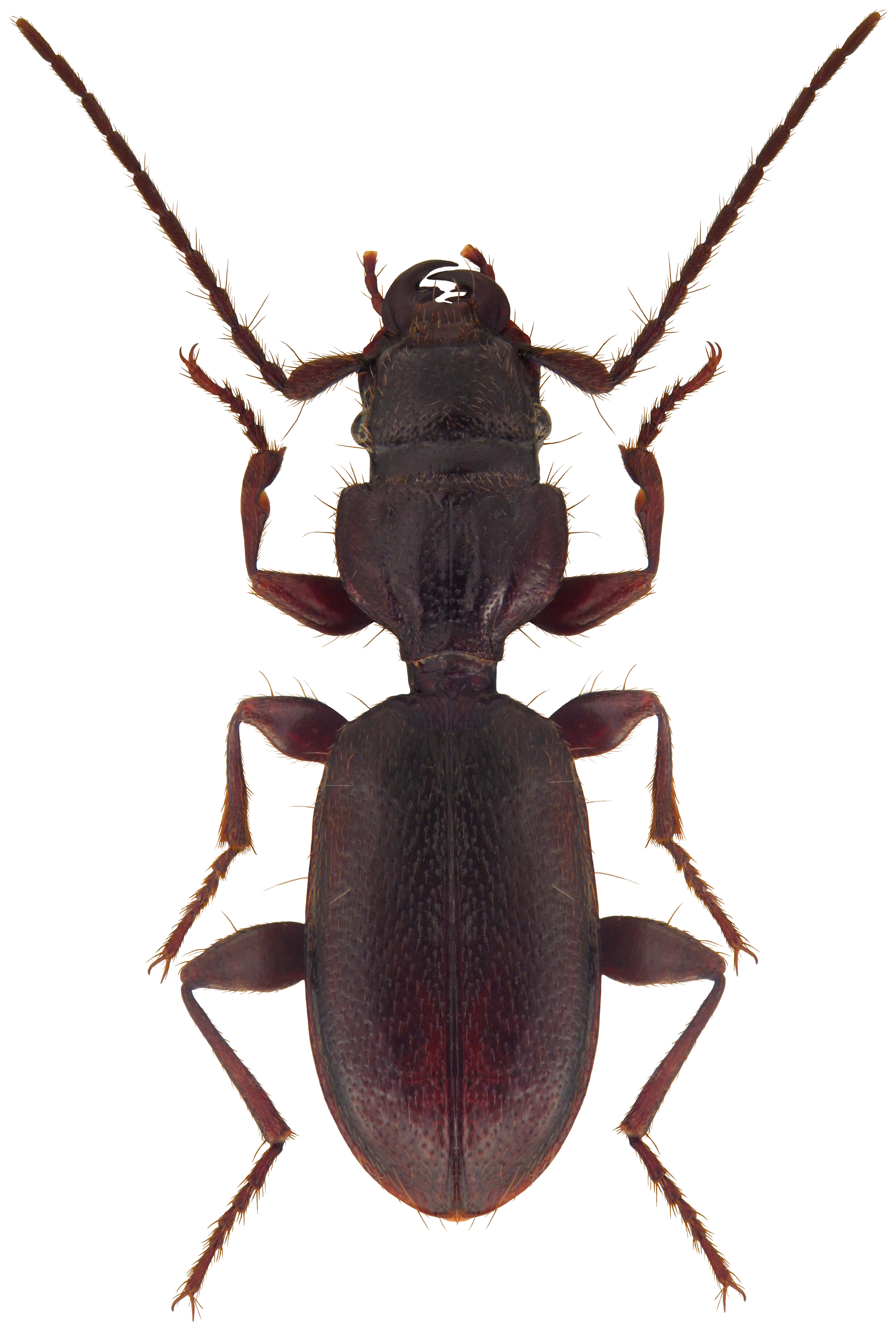
- Siagona europaea

Scientific classification
- Domain: Eukaryota
- Kingdom: Animalia
- Phylum: Arthropoda
- Class: Insecta
- Order: Coleoptera
- Suborder: Adephaga
- Family: Carabidae
- Subfamily: Siagoninae; Bonelli, 1813

Tribes
- Enceladini G.Horn, 1881; Siagonini Bonelli, 1813

= Siagoninae =

Subfamily of beetles

Siagoninae is a subfamily of ground beetles in the family Carabidae. There are at least 3 genera and more than 80 described species in Siagoninae.

== Genera ==
These three genera belong to the subfamily Siagoninae:

- Enceladus Bonelli, 1813
- Luperca Laporte, 1840
- Siagona Latreille, 1804
