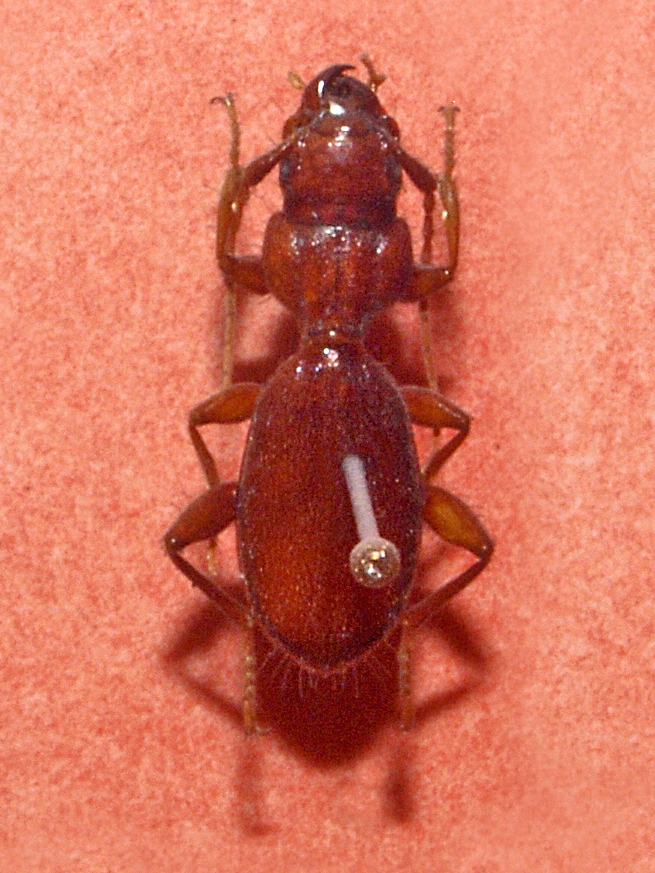
- Siagona jenissonii

Scientific classification
- Kingdom: Animalia
- Phylum: Arthropoda
- Class: Insecta
- Order: Coleoptera
- Suborder: Adephaga
- Family: Carabidae
- Subfamily: Siagoninae
- Tribe: Siagonini
- Genus: Siagona; Latreille, 1804

= Siagona =

Genus of beetles

Siagona is a genus of ground beetles in the family Carabidae. There are more than 80 described species in Siagona, found mainly in Africa, the Mediterranean, and southern Asia.

== Species ==
These 83 species belong to the genus Siagona:

- Siagona angulifrons Bates, 1892
- Siagona angustata Chaudoir, 1843
- Siagona angustipennis Bates, 1892
- Siagona apicalis Andrewes, 1921
- Siagona atrata Dejean, 1825
- Siagona australis Péringuey, 1892
- Siagona baconi Chaudoir, 1876
- Siagona basilewskyi Lecordier, 1970
- Siagona brunnipes Dejean, 1825
- Siagona caffra Boheman, 1848
- Siagona carinata Lecordier, 1978
- Siagona cinctella Chaudoir, 1876
- Siagona conradti Kolbe, 1895
- Siagona crassidens Bates, 1889
- Siagona cyathodera Andrewes, 1921
- Siagona cyclobasis Chaudoir, 1876
- Siagona dageti Lecordier, 1978
- Siagona dejeani Rambur, 1837
- Siagona depressa (Fabricius, 1798)
- Siagona dichroa Lecordier, 1978
- Siagona dilutipes Chaudoir, 1850
- Siagona discoidalis Kolbe, 1895
- Siagona dorsalis Dejean, 1831
- Siagona elegantula Lecordier, 1979
- Siagona europaea Dejean, 1826
- Siagona fabricii Andrewes, 1921
- Siagona ferrugata Lecordier, 1978
- Siagona ferruginea Lecordier, 1970
- Siagona flesus (Fabricius, 1801)
- Siagona fuscipes Bonelli, 1813
- Siagona gerardi Buquet, 1840
- Siagona gilloni Lecordier, 1968
- Siagona gruveli Lecordier, 1968
- Siagona hiekei Lecordier, 1981
- Siagona hovana Fairmaire, 1900
- Siagona induta Chaudoir, 1876
- Siagona insulana Andrewes, 1936
- Siagona inusta Lecordier, 1978
- Siagona jeanneli Lecordier, 1978
- Siagona jenissonii Dejean, 1826
- Siagona kindermanni Chaudoir, 1861
- Siagona kulla Andrewes, 1921
- Siagona leprieuri Lecordier, 1968
- Siagona levasseuri Lecordier, 1970
- Siagona longula Reiche & Saulcy, 1855
- Siagona macrocephala Lecordier, 1970
- Siagona mandibularis Guérin-Méneville, 1838
- Siagona menieri Lecordier, 1973
- Siagona minor Alluaud, 1923
- Siagona navicularis Bänninger, 1933
- Siagona oberleitneri Dejean, 1830
- Siagona obscuripes Chaudoir, 1876
- Siagona pallipes Lecordier, 1970
- Siagona parallela Lecordier, 1968
- Siagona partita Lecordier, 1979
- Siagona peculiariclypeata Hovorka, 2019
- Siagona picea Chaudoir, 1843
- Siagona plana (Fabricius, 1801)
- Siagona plicata Andrewes, 1929
- Siagona polita Andrewes, 1921
- Siagona pubescens Chaudoir, 1850
- Siagona pubigera Chaudoir, 1876
- Siagona pumila Andrewes, 1922
- Siagona punctata (Lecordier, 1977)
- Siagona punctatula Lecordier, 1970
- Siagona punctulata Chaudoir, 1876
- Siagona pygmaea Andrewes, 1921
- Siagona rifensis Alluaud, 1932
- Siagona rubescens Andrewes, 1929
- Siagona rubra Lecordier, 1979
- Siagona rufipes (Fabricius, 1792)
- Siagona rustica Andrewes, 1929
- Siagona senegalensis Dejean, 1831
- Siagona signaticolla Lecordier, 1979
- Siagona simplex Péringuey, 1892
- Siagona sinistra Darlington, 1967
- Siagona sinuata Lecordier, 1979
- Siagona somalia Fairmaire, 1887
- Siagona sublaevis Chaudoir, 1876
- Siagona taggadertensis Junger & Faille, 2011
- Siagona ustulata Lecordier, 1979
- Siagona vanstraeleni Basilewsky, 1962
- Siagona vittata Lecordier, 1970
