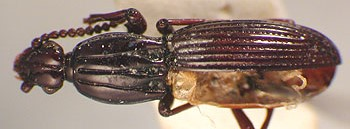
- Medisores abditus

Scientific classification
- Domain: Eukaryota
- Kingdom: Animalia
- Phylum: Arthropoda
- Class: Insecta
- Order: Coleoptera
- Suborder: Adephaga
- Family: Carabidae
- Subfamily: Rhysodinae
- Genus: Medisores; R.T. Bell & J.R. Bell, 1987

Species
- Medisores abditus R.T. Bell & J.R. Bell, 1987

= Medisores =

Genus of beetles

Medisores is a genus of wrinkled bark beetles in the family Carabidae. Its only species is Medisores abditus, found in South Africa. Only four specimens of this species have been found, all found dead in wood of Cassiopourea gummiflua, the onionwood tree.
