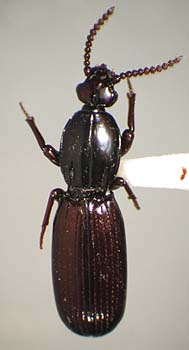
- Specimen from near Parakao

Conservation status
- Naturally Uncommon (NZ TCS)

Scientific classification
- Kingdom: Animalia
- Phylum: Arthropoda
- Class: Insecta
- Order: Coleoptera
- Suborder: Adephaga
- Family: Carabidae
- Subfamily: Rhysodinae
- Genus: Tangarona; R.T. Bell & J.R. Bell, 1982
- Species: T. pensa

Binomial name
- Tangarona pensa (Broun, 1880)

Synonyms
- Genus: Tangaroa R.T. & J.R.Bell, 1978 – preoccupied by Tangaroa Lehtinen, 1967; Species: Rhysodes pensus Broun, 1880; Tangaroa pensus (Broun 1880)

= Tangarona =

Genus of beetles

Tangarona is a genus of wrinkled bark beetles in the family Carabidae. Tangarona pensa, found in New Zealand, is the only species of this genus.

Tangarona pensa measure 7–9 mm (0.28–0.35 in) in length.
