= Srimara =

Scientific classification
- Domain: Eukaryota
- Kingdom: Animalia
- Phylum: Arthropoda
- Class: Insecta
- Order: Coleoptera
- Suborder: Adephaga
- Family: Carabidae
- Subfamily: Rhysodinae
- Genus: Srimara; R.T. Bell & J.R. Bell, 1978

Species
- Srimara planicollis R.T. Bell & J.R. Bell, 1978

Genus of beetles

Srimara is a genus of wrinkled bark beetles in the family Carabidae. Srimara planicollis, found in Vietnam, is the only species of this genus.
