= Kaveinga =

- Kaveinga abbreviata

Scientific classification
- Domain: Eukaryota
- Kingdom: Animalia
- Phylum: Arthropoda
- Class: Insecta
- Order: Coleoptera
- Suborder: Adephaga
- Family: Carabidae
- Subfamily: Rhysodinae
- Genus: Kaveinga; R.T. Bell & J.R. Bell, 1978

Genus of beetles

Kaveinga is a genus of wrinkled bark beetles in the family Carabidae.

== Species ==
Kaveinga contains the following species:

- Kaveinga abbreviata (Lea, 1904) (New Guinea and Australia)
- Kaveinga bellorum Emberson, 1995 (New Zealand)
- Kaveinga cylindrica (Arrow, 1942) (New Guinea)
- Kaveinga fibulata R.T. Bell & J.R. Bell, 1979
- Kaveinga frontalis (Grouvelle, 1903) (Australia)
- Kaveinga histrio R.T. & J.R.Bell, 1979 (Indonesia and Philippines)
- Kaveinga jakli Hovorka, 2020 (Indonesia)
- Kaveinga kukum R.T. & J.R.Bell, 1979 (the Solomon Islands)
- Kaveinga lupata R.T. & J.R.Bell, 1979 (New Guinea)
- Kaveinga lusca (Chevrolat, 1876) (New Zealand)
- Kaveinga marifuanga R.T. & J.R.Bell, 1979 (New Guinea)
- Kaveinga nudicornis R.T. & J.R.Bell, 1979 (the Solomon Islands)
- Kaveinga occipitalis (Grouvelle, 1903) (New Guinea)
- Kaveinga okapa R.T. & J.R.Bell, 1979 (New Guinea)
- Kaveinga orbitosa (Broun, 1880) (New Zealand)
- Kaveinga parva (Grouvelle, 1895) (New Guinea)
- Kaveinga pignoris R.T. & J.R.Bell, 1979 (the Solomon Islands)
- Kaveinga poggii R.T. & J.R.Bell, 1985 (New Guinea)
- Kaveinga setosa (Grouvelle, 1903) (New Caledonia)
- Kaveinga stiletto R.T. & J.R.Bell, 1992 (Australia)
- Kaveinga strigiceps R.T. & J.R.Bell, 1979 (Indonesia)
- Kaveinga timorensis Hovorka, 2020 (Indonesia)
- Kaveinga ulteria R.T. & J.R.Bell, 1979 (the Solomon Islands)
- Kaveinga waai R.T. & J.R.Bell, 2000 (Indonesia)
- Kaveinga walfordi R.T. & J.R.Bell, 1992 (Australia)
