= Neodhysores =

Scientific classification
- Domain: Eukaryota
- Kingdom: Animalia
- Phylum: Arthropoda
- Class: Insecta
- Order: Coleoptera
- Suborder: Adephaga
- Family: Carabidae
- Subfamily: Rhysodinae
- Genus: Neodhysores; R.T. Bell & J.R. Bell, 1978

Genus of beetles

Neodhysores is a genus of wrinkled bark beetles in the family Carabidae, found in Southeastern Brazil. Only three specimens of this genus are known to have been found, representing these two species:

- Neodhysores schreiberi (Vulcano & Pereira, 1975)
- Neodhysores seximpressus R.T. Bell & J.R. Bell, 1978
