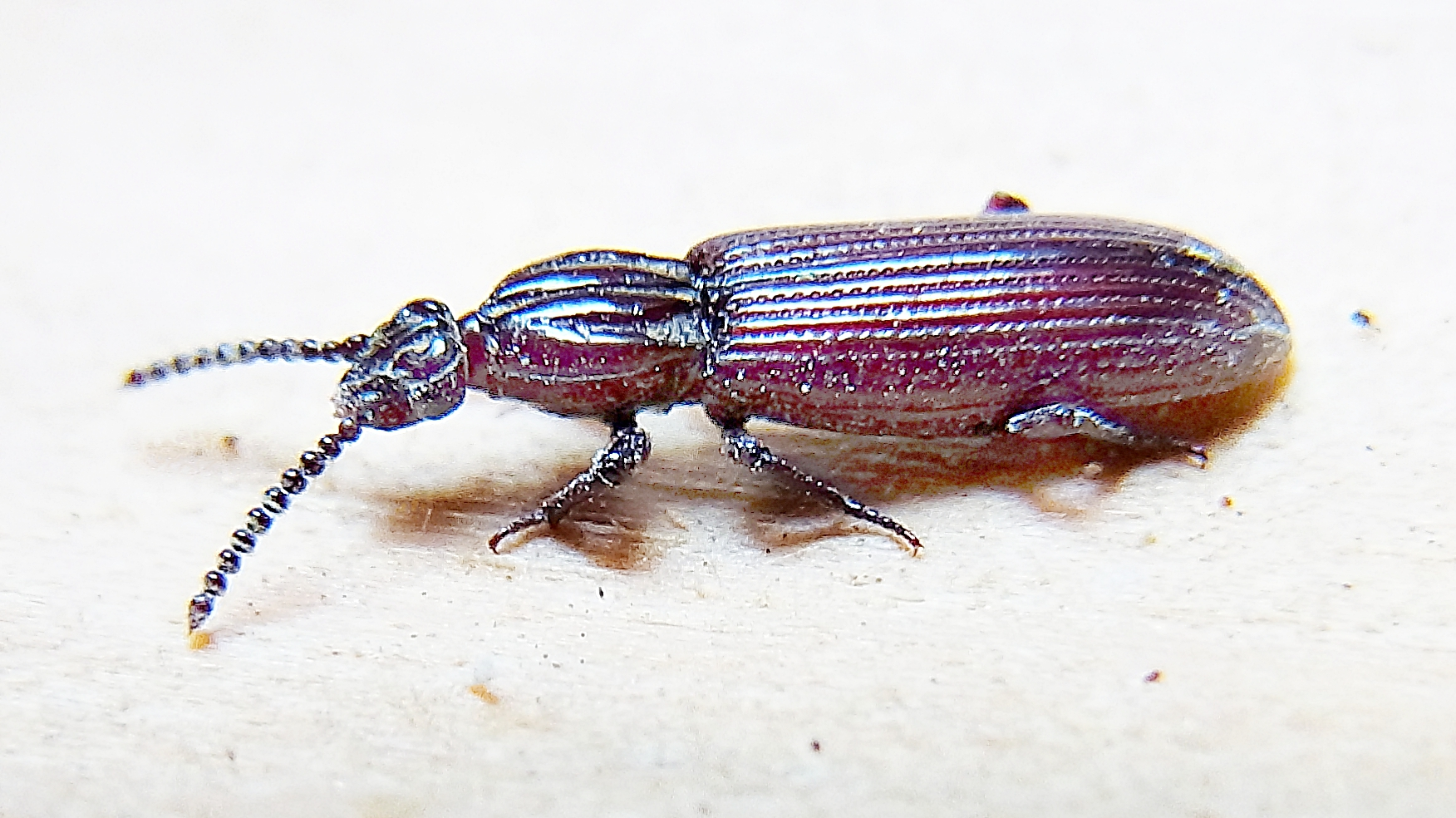
- Rhysodes sulcatus

Scientific classification
- Domain: Eukaryota
- Kingdom: Animalia
- Phylum: Arthropoda
- Class: Insecta
- Order: Coleoptera
- Suborder: Adephaga
- Family: Carabidae
- Subfamily: Rhysodinae
- Genus: Rhysodes; Germar, 1822

= Rhysodes =

Genus of beetles

Rhysodes is a genus of ground beetle in the subfamily Rhysodinae native to the Palearctic (including Europe) and the Near East.

There are currently two known species:

- Rhysodes comes (Lewis, 1888)
- Rhysodes sulcatus (Fabricius, 1787)
