= Xhosores =

Scientific classification
- Domain: Eukaryota
- Kingdom: Animalia
- Phylum: Arthropoda
- Class: Insecta
- Order: Coleoptera
- Suborder: Adephaga
- Superfamily: Caraboidea
- Family: Carabidae
- Subfamily: Rhysodinae
- Genus: Xhosores; R.T. Bell & J.R. Bell, 1978
- Species: X. figuratus

Binomial name
- Xhosores figuratus (Germar, 1840)

Genus of beetles

Xhosores is a genus of wrinkled bark beetles in the family Carabidae. Xhosores figuratus, found in South Africa, is the only species of this genus.
