= Tim G. Benton =

British biologist

- Born: 2 March 1967 (age 59); Britain
- Education: University of Cambridge
- Known for: Research on the sustainability of food systems
- Scientific career
- Fields: Climate change, Agroecology, Food security, Sustainable development
- Workplaces: Chatham House; University of Leeds

Tim G. Benton is a British biologist. He leads the energy, environmental and resource programs and is the lead researcher on emerging risks at Chatham House.

Benton studied at the University of Oxford (BA) and received his PhD in 1990 from Cambridge (PhD), both in zoology. He joined Chatham House in 2016 as an Excellent Visiting Scholar while serving as Dean of Strategic Research Initiatives at the University of Leeds. He was Professor of Population Ecology at the University of Leeds School of Biology and UK Champion for Global Food Security.

Benton's research covers global food security, food systems and resilience, ecology and natural resources, and impacts on climate change. He is one of the authors of the Intergovernmental Panel on Climate Change and Land and the UK Climate Change Risk Assessment 2017 and has published more than 150 papers.

On October 16, 2020, Tim Benton was made Doctor Honoris Causa of UCLouvain.
