= Christian Overgaard Nielsen =

Danish zoologist and ecologist

Christian Overgaard Nielsen (January 16, 1918 – January 26, 1999) was a Danish zoologist and ecologist.

== Biography ==
Overgaard Nielsen was born at Snejbjerg in Herning, Denmark. He earned his Masters of Science degree in Anatomy during 1943.

From 1944-49, he was an assistant at the University of Copenhagen Histological-Embryological Institute. He was a soil ecologist, specializing in soil nematodes and Enchytraeidae. He investigated the role of the soil microfauna in the decomposition of plant litter and recycling of nutrients in ecosystems.

He was a visiting scientist with Charles Elton at Oxford University from 1950-1953.

He was the first Editor-in-Chief of the scientific publication Oikos Journal (1949-1965).

He was employed by Molslaboratoriet at Aarhus University where he became department head in 1958 and associate professor in 1961.

In 1964, he was appointed professor of zoology at the University of Copenhagen where he held the professorship until 1985.
