= Per Brinck =

Swedish zoologist

- Born: Per Simon Valdemar Brinck; 4 September 1919
- Died: 6 October 2013 (aged 94)

Per Simon Valdemar Brinck (4 September 1919 – 6 October 2013) was a Swedish zoologist.

Brinck began his career as a veterinarian but wrote a thesis on Plecoptera and later became a worldwide authority on Gyrinidae. He travelled extensively to Africa and Southeast Asia, among others co-publishing the fifteen-volume South African Animal Life between 1955 and 1973. He served as a professor of zoology at the Lund University from 1958 to 1986. Brinck edited the journal Oikos from 1965 to 1989, and since 2007 the journal has given out the Per Brinck Oikos Award.

Brinck was a fellow of the Royal Swedish Academy of Sciences from 1974 and of the Norwegian Academy of Science and Letters. He also was an Honorary Member of the British Ecological Society.

The genera Perbrinckia and Perbrinckiella have been named after him.
