= Enceladus (beetle) =

Scientific classification
- Domain: Eukaryota
- Kingdom: Animalia
- Phylum: Arthropoda
- Class: Insecta
- Order: Coleoptera
- Suborder: Adephaga
- Family: Carabidae
- Tribe: Enceladini
- Genus: Enceladus; Bonelli, 1813
- Species: E. gygas

Binomial name
- Enceladus gygas Bonelli, 1813

Genus of beetles

Enceladus is a genus of ground beetles in the family Carabidae. This genus has a single species, Enceladus gygas, found in South America.
