= George Lewis (coleopterist) =

English entomologist (1839–1926)

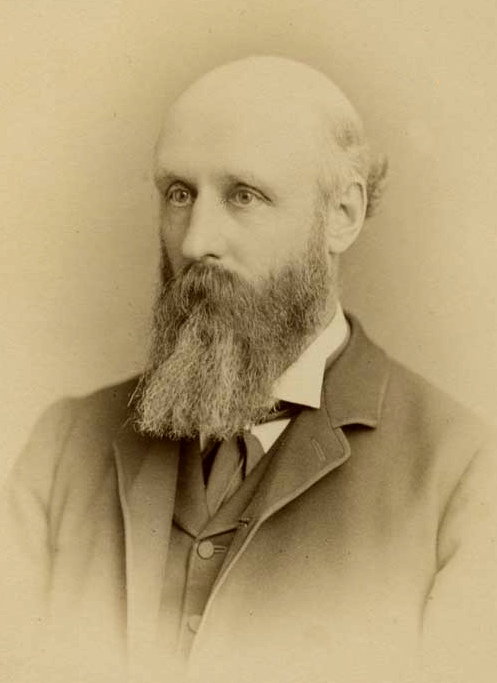

George Lewis (1839–1926), F.L.S., F.E.S., was an English entomologist. He was a specialist in Coleoptera.

Lewis was born on 5 August 1839, the second son of the Rev. R. Cr. Lewis, first Vicar of St. John's, Blackheath, S.E. He was educated at the Blackheath Proprietary School.

In 1862 he went to China for the tea trade and returned to England twenty years later, after also spending periods in Japan and Sri Lanka.

He married Miss Julia Hunter, of Iiiuer Park Road, Wimbledon Common. Soon after his marriage in 1867, he spent several years traveling and collecting beetles in Japan, and he visited that country again in 1880. He also collected in Ceylon and Algiers.

An ardent entomologist from boyhood, Lewis made important collections of beetles in the East, most of which were acquired by the British Museum. He authored numerous taxa, including 750 species in the family Histeridae (a tiny fraction being listed here) and had been for many years the recognized authority on the beetles of the family Histeridae, of which he bequeathed to the British Museum a magnificent collection of over 12,000 specimens, including the types of 110 fewer than 700 species described by himself. Much of the collection formed during his first visit to Japan was destroyed, although many new species were described by the late H. M. Bates.

Lewis died at Folkestone on 5 September 1926.
