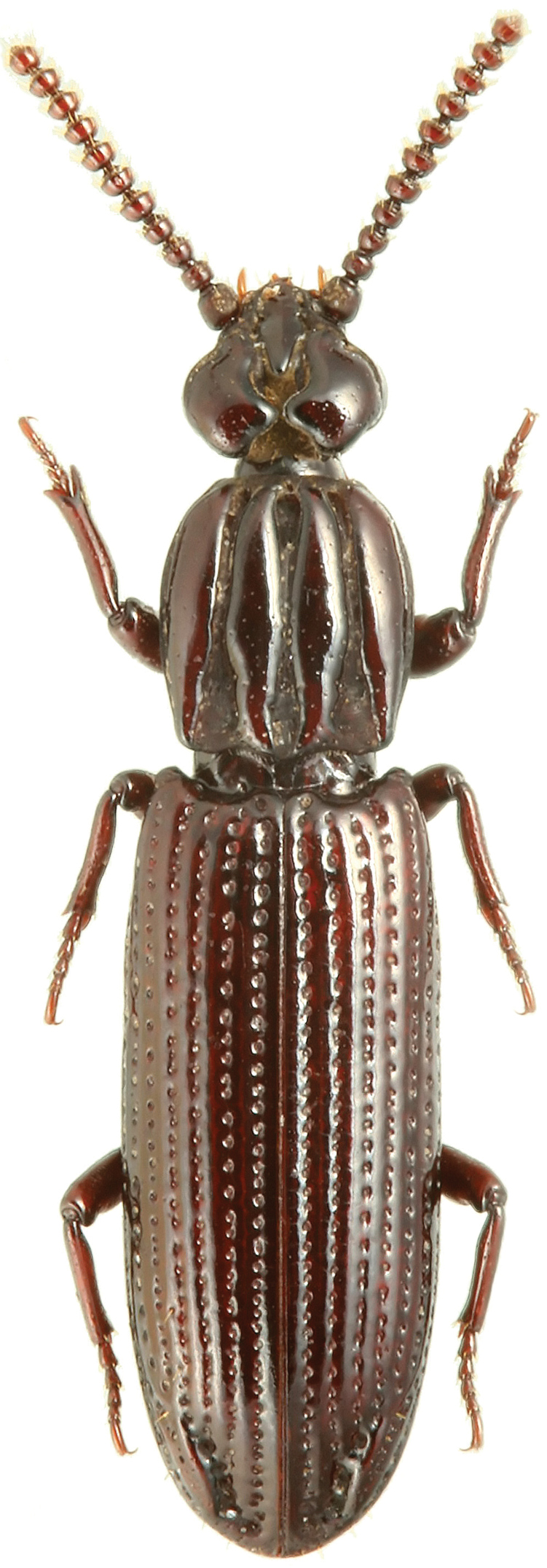
- Omoglymmius americanus

Scientific classification
- Kingdom: Animalia
- Phylum: Arthropoda
- Class: Insecta
- Order: Coleoptera
- Suborder: Adephaga
- Family: Carabidae
- Subfamily: Rhysodinae; Laporte, 1840

= Rhysodinae =

Subfamily of beetles

Rhysodinae is a subfamily (sometimes called wrinkled bark beetles) in the family Carabidae. There are 19 genera and at least 380 described species in Rhysodinae. The group of genera making up Rhysodinae had been treated as the family Rhysodidae in the past, and subsequent DNA analysis then placed it within Carabidae, where it was sometimes treated as the tribe Rhysodini, but the most recent analyses place it as a subfamily in a clade along with subfamilies Paussinae and Siagoninae, forming a sister to the remaining Carabidae.

== Description ==
These beetles are elongate, in size ranging from 5–8 mm, and color ranging from a reddish brown to black. Both the thorax and the elytra are deeply grooved lengthwise, thus giving these beetles their common name. The head is also grooved, and posteriorly constricted into a short but visible "neck". The 11-segment antennae are short, resembling a string of beads, while the mandibles lack cutting edges and are thus nonfunctional. The front legs are short and strongly built.

Adults and larvae live in moist rotten wood that is infested with slime moulds, which are believed to be their diet. Instead of using their mandibles to bite, they use the anterior edge of the mentum and swivel their heads to cut off pieces of food. Adults do not make burrows, instead just squeezing between the cell layers of the decomposed wood, generally leaving no visible trace of their passage, while larvae live in short tunnels.

They occur on all continents with forested areas, the richest fauna being found in New Guinea, Indonesia, the Philippines, and northern South America.

== Genera ==
Position in relation to the Carabidae according to Vasilikopoulos et al., 2021

- - Cicindelidae
    ⊞
    - Manticorini
    - - Megacephalini
      - - Collyridini
        - - Cicindelini
          - Oxycheilini
    ⊟
  - Carabidae
    - - Rhysodinae
      - - Paussinae
        - Siagoninae
    - ⊞other subfamilies
      - - - Carabinae
          - Nebriinae
        - - - Broscinae
            - Elaphrinae
          - - Loricerinae
            - Omophroninae
      - - Scaritinae
        - - Trechinae
          - - Brachininae
            - Harpalinae
      ⊟

Tribe Clinidiini R.T. & J.R.Bell, 1978

Clinidium Kirby, 1830
Grouvellina R.T. & J.R.Bell, 1978
Rhyzodiastes Fairmaire, 1895

Tribe Dhysorini R.T. & J.R.Bell, 1978

Dhysores Grouvelle, 1903
Neodhysores R.T. & J.R.Bell, 1978
Tangarona R.T. & J.R.Bell, 1982

Tribe Leoglymmiini R.T. & J.R.Bell, 1978

Leoglymmius R.T. & J.R.Bell, 1978

Tribe Medisorini R.T. & J.R.Bell, 1987

Medisores R.T. & J.R.Bell, 1987

Tribe Omoglymmiini R.T. & J.R.Bell, 1978

Arrowina R.T. Bell & J.R. Bell, 1978
Omoglymmius Ganglbauer, 1891
Plesioglymmius R.T. & J.R.Bell, 1978
Shyrodes Grouvelle, 1903
Srimara R.T. & J.R.Bell, 1978
Xhosores R.T. & J.R.Bell, 1978
Yamatosa R.T. & J.R.Bell, 1979

Tribe Rhysodini Laporte, 1840

Kaveinga R.T. & J.R.Bell, 1978
Kupeus R.T. & J.R.Bell, 1982
Rhysodes Germar, 1822

Tribe Sloanoglymmiini R.T. & J.R.Bell, 1991

Sloanoglymmius R.T. & J.R.Bell, 1991
