= John Abraham (engineer) =

American professor

John P. Abraham
- Education: Ph.D. 2002, Mechanical Engineering, University of Minnesota
- Known for: Global warming debate (Climate Science Rapid Response Team)
- Awards: NCSE Friend of the Planet Award
- Scientific career
- Fields: Thermodynamics, heat flow, numerical simulation, energy
- Workplaces: Los Alamos National Laboratory; University of St. Thomas School of Engineering, Minnesota (Associate Prof.)
- Thesis: A comprehensive experimental, analytical, and numerical investigation of the modes of heat transfer in an electrically heated oven (2002)
- Website: www.stthomas.edu/engineering/faculty/john-p-abraham.html

John P. Abraham is a professor of mechanical engineering and thermal sciences in the College of Engineering at the University of St. Thomas in Minnesota, United States. He teaches and carries out research in mechanical engineering in the thermal sciences, biomedical engineering, renewable energy, medical devices, burn injuries, electronics and datacenter cooling, climate change and with other engineered devices.

He cam to public prominence in 2009 after analyzing misrepresentations being used to promote climate change denial, and from 2010 became a prominent defender of science in the global warming controversy. In that year, he helped to launch the Climate Science Rapid Response Team.

== Career ==
Abraham is professor of thermal science (thermodynamics) and fluid mechanics at the University of St. Thomas School of Engineering, Minnesota. His area of research includes thermodynamics, heat transfer, fluid flow, numerical simulation, and energy. After gaining his doctorate at the University of Minnesota in 2002, he joined St. Thomas as an adjunct instructor, later becoming a full-time member of the faculty. He has published over 600 papers in journals, conferences, book chapters, books, and patents. Since 1997 has also been an engineering consultant working on industrial research in aerospace, biomedical, energy and manufacturing industries. He has also served as an expert witness in numerous scald and injury lawsuits and for intellectual property (patent) cases and in other litigations. He works on clean and renewable wind and solar projects in the developing world, and has also produced numerous books, such as a 2014 text on small-scale wind power and a 2010 groundbreaking text on laminar-to-turbulent fluid flow.

== Research ==
Abraham has been cited over 16,000 times by his peers in the scientific community and he has 16 articles with Altmetric scores above the top 5%. His active research includes ocean warming that has received extensive press attention. He has also become active in Artificial intelligence. Abraham uses AI tools in his engineering research; he also speaks publicly about the pros and cons of AI development on jobs, the environment, and the economy.

== Refutation of climate change denial ==
Abraham felt it was necessary to respond to a talk given to the Minnesota Free Market Institute in October 2009 by a well-known denier of human-caused global warming, Christopher Monckton. He thought "this guy is a great speaker and he is very convincing. If I didn't know the science, I would believe him. Frankly, the nonscientists in the audience didn't have a chance. They had no way of knowing what he said was not true. I felt Monckton took advantage of them and he knew he was taking advantage of them." In the following months he carried out research, contacting scientists cited by Monckton, and in late May 2010, he posted online an 83-minute video rebutting Monckton's statements. This attracted little attention at first, until it was highlighted by an article George Monbiot published in The Guardian.

Abraham's presentation and the response from Monckton subsequently received world-wide attention. More recently, Abraham and a number of colleagues including Michael E. Mann submitted a document to the United States Congress which set out to refute nine errors in Christopher Monckton's May 6, 2010, testimony.

In November 2010, Abraham (and two colleagues, Scott Mandia and Ray Weymann) launched the Climate Science Rapid Response Team, to provide rapid, high-quality scientific information to the media and government decision-makers. The intention of this group is to enable scientists to share their work directly with the general public. This effort has been covered by many media outlets. The effort has an online page for media to submit their questions.

Abraham estimated early in 2012 that since beginning his rebuttal he had put around 1,000 unpaid hours into work on climate change and the controversy. He has given numerous speeches to publicize global warming issues, but does not accept funding for climate research or ask for an honorarium for speeches: if payment is given he asks that it goes to St. Thomas or to charity.
