= J1000+0221 =

Gravitationally-lensed galaxy

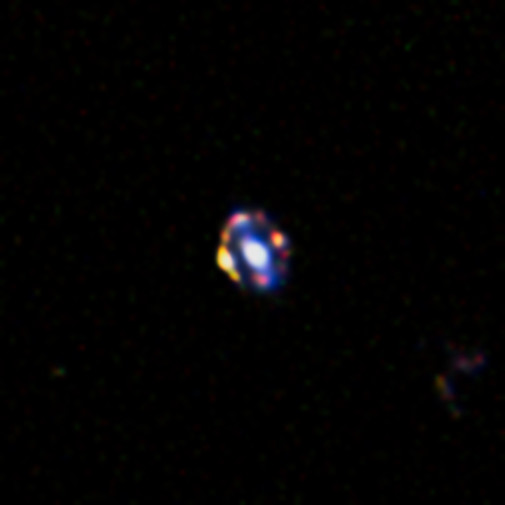
- This image shows the quadruple gravitational lens J1000+0221. Image credit: NASA / ESA / A. van der Wel.

Observation data (J2000 epoch)
- Constellation: Sextans
- Right ascension: 10^{h} 00^{m} 18.47^{s}
- Declination: +02° 21′ 38.74″
- Redshift: lens: 1.53 ± 0.09 source: 3.417 ± 0.001
- Heliocentric radial velocity: lens: 218777 km/s source: 270559 km/s

Characteristics
- Mass: (7.6 ± 0.5)×10^{10} M_{☉}
- Half-light radius (physical): lens: 8.2 ± 0.3 kly (2.5 ± 0.1 kpc)
- Half-light radius (apparent): 0.29 ± 0.01”

Other designations
- J100018.47+022138.74

J1000+0221 was the most distant gravitational lens galaxy known (up until the discovery of the IRC 0218 lens galaxy), and remains the most distant quad-image lens galaxy discovered so far. The measured distance the light has traveled, including the lensed deflection, is 9.4 billion light years. A very recent discovery by a group of astronomers led by Dr Arjen Van der Wel from the Max Planck Institute for Astronomy in Heidelberg, Germany, the results of which are accepted for publication on October 21, 2013 in the Astrophysical Journal Letters (arXiv.org). Using NASA’s Hubble Space Telescope, the astronomers discovered this quadruple gravitational lens dubbed J1000+0221 which would provide a further test for Einstein's theory of general relativity. These gravitational lenses also serve as light magnification tools that help astronomers to look at distant galaxies thus acting as a natural telescope.
