= Public Employees for Environmental Responsibility =

American whistleblower protection nonprofit

- Abbreviation: PEER
- Formation: 1996
- Type: 501(c)(3) organization
- Purpose: Environmental protection; whistleblower advocacy
- Headquarters: United States
- Region served: United States
- Methods: Investigations; Freedom of Information Act requests; litigation; public advocacy
- Affiliations: Climate Science Legal Defense Fund (former)

Public Employees for Environmental Responsibility (PEER) is a 501(c)(3) non-profit, environmental protection organization of local, state, and national government natural resource and environmental professionals. PEER serves as a resource to potential government whistleblowers, allowing them to anonymously expose environmental wrongdoings and assisting them in redressing agency retaliation.

Founded in 1996, PEER operates primarily by investigating claims from public employees about government environmental misconduct. Because whistleblowers often face direct retaliation from the offending agencies, PEER encourages employees to act through the organization to reveal government environmental misdeeds. Once a claim is made, PEER investigates it, often using Freedom of Information Act requests. The organization then can choose to take a number of actions, including press releases or lawsuits. PEER also serves to provide legal services to whistleblowers who find themselves the target of agency retaliation. PEER was formerly affiliated with the Climate Science Legal Defense Fund, a not-for-profit organization established in 2011 to protect scientific research and researchers of climate science from think tanks and legal foundations that have taken legal action against scientific institutions and individual scientists.

== Campaigns ==
PEER maintains campaigns in leading environmental and public health issues. Some of their work includes:

=== Protecting Public Lands ===
PEER is pushing back against efforts to undermine our public lands for the benefit of special interests by: challenging government agencies to protect and restore wildlife and ecosystems from the effects of overgrazing; working to minimize the impacts of the fossil fuel industry on public lands; and supporting increased staff levels in land management agencies.

=== North Atlantic Right Whale ===
PEER is pressing the National Oceanic and Atmospheric Administration (NOAA) to adopt safeguards to prevent needless deaths of highly endangered North Atlantic right whales by underlining true mortality caused by entanglements with fishing lines while continuing to push for adoption of our comprehensive strategy for averting whale ship strikes.

=== PFAS ===
PEER works with current and former local, state and federal employees who want government agencies to do more to protect people and wildlife from toxic per- and polyfluoroalkyl substances (PFAS), or "forever chemicals". PEER advocates for the regulation of PFAS as a family of chemicals, banning all non-essential uses of PFAS, and setting comprehensive standards for PFAS.

=== Teresa Chambers ===
Former chief of the United States Park Police Teresa Chambers served for nearly two years before she was fired after revealing in an interview the potential dangers of their low staffing levels. PEER has provided Teresa legal defense and publicity for her appeal for reinstatement and for her wrongful firing lawsuit.

=== Suppression of Wolf Research ===
PEER has been involved in challenging the suppression of research by the Washington Department of Fish and Wildlife and Washington State University concerning the ineffectiveness of lethal control in preventing future depredation of livestock. They have also been critical of the Wisconsin Department of Natural Resources' lax regulation of recreational hunting and its impact on the federally endangered Great Lakes gray wolf.

== Faith-based parks ==
PEER has worked to keep religious promotions out of public parks.

=== Grand Canyon National Park ===
The National Park Service in 2003 approved for sale in the Grand Canyon National Park bookstore Grand Canyon: A Different View: a book that presents the formation of the Grand Canyon as a result of Biblical events. PEER exposed the selling of this book as preferential treatment of a religion that toes the line of constitutional legality. On January 4, 2007, the National Park Service Chief of Public Affairs, David Barna released a response stating that the National Park Service neither uses the text in their teaching nor do they endorse its content. The release further states that the book is sold in the inspirational section of the bookstore which includes anthropological works on Native American culture. As PEER contests, the inspirational section was only created after PEER had exposed the book's sale as a natural history. The controversial book remains on sale.

The National Park Service has continued to delay the issuing of a pamphlet "Geologic Interpretive Programs: Distinguishing Science from Religion" which is meant to instruct park officials on how to respond to questions like those concerning biblical interpretations of the Grand Canyon.

=== Mojave National Preserve ===
PEER board member, Frank Buono, along with the American Civil Liberties Union of Southern California, filed a lawsuit to remove an 8-foot-tall (2.4 m) white cross displayed in the Mojave National Preserve. The cross, which was originally erected in 1934 as a war memorial has since undergone many changes in appearance, including the loss of its plaque. It now stands as an 8-foot-tall (2.4 m) white cross serving occasionally as the site for Easter sunrise services. Most recently, the order to remove the cross has been upheld by the United States Court of Appeals for the Ninth Circuit, despite four appeals by the U.S. Justice Department. The cross now awaits removal, unless there is a fifth appeal by the Justice Department that could potentially bring the case to the Supreme Court.

== Leadership ==
- Executive Director: Tim Whitehouse
