= Gravitational lens =

Light bending by mass between source and observer

A light source passes behind a gravitational lens (invisible point mass placed in the center of the image). The aqua circle is the light source as it would be seen if there were no lens, while white spots are the multiple images of the source (see Einstein ring).

A gravitational lens is matter, such as a cluster of galaxies or a point particle, in sufficient quantity and density to bend light noticeably from a distant source as it travels toward an observer. The amount of gravitational lensing is described by Albert Einstein's general theory of relativity. If light is treated as corpuscles travelling at the speed of light, Newtonian physics also predicts the bending of light, but only half of that predicted by general relativity.

Orest Khvolson (1924) and Frantisek Link (1936) are generally credited with being the first to discuss the effect in print, but it is more commonly associated with Einstein, who made unpublished calculations on it in 1912 and published an article on the subject in 1936.

In 1937, Fritz Zwicky posited that galaxy clusters could act as gravitational lenses, a claim confirmed in 1979 by observation of the Twin QSO SBS 0957+561.

== Description ==
A schematic showing how light from a distant spiral galaxy is bent around a foreground elliptical galaxy, producing the lensed arcs seen in the inset image — an illustration of strong gravitational lensing.

An analysis of the distortion of SDP.81 caused by this effect has revealed star-forming clumps of matter.

Unlike an optical lens, a point-like gravitational lens produces a maximum deflection of light that passes closest to its center, and a minimum deflection of light that travels furthest from its center. Consequently, a gravitational lens has no single focal point, but a focal line. The term "lens" in the context of gravitational light deflection was first used by O. J. Lodge, who remarked that it is "not permissible to say that the solar gravitational field acts like a lens, for it has no focal length". If the (light) source, the massive lensing object, and the observer lie in a straight line, the original light source will appear as a ring around the massive lensing object (provided the lens has circular symmetry). If there is any misalignment, the observer will see an arc segment instead.

This phenomenon was first mentioned in 1924 by the St. Petersburg physicist Orest Khvolson, and quantified by Albert Einstein in 1936. It is usually referred to in the literature as an Einstein ring, since Khvolson did not concern himself with the flux or radius of the ring image. More commonly, where the lensing mass is complex (such as a galaxy group or cluster) and does not cause a spherical distortion of spacetime, the source will resemble partial arcs scattered around the lens. The observer may then see multiple distorted images of the same source; the number and shape of these depending upon the relative positions of the source, lens, and observer, and the shape of the gravitational well of the lensing object.

There are three classes of gravitational lensing:

Strong lensing
Where there are easily visible distortions such as the formation of Einstein rings, arcs, and multiple images. Despite being considered "strong", the effect is in general relatively small, such that even a galaxy with a mass more than 100 billion times that of the Sun will produce multiple images separated by only a few arcseconds. Galaxy clusters can produce separations of several arcminutes. In both cases the galaxies and sources are quite distant, many hundreds of megaparsecs away from the Milky Way.
Weak lensing
Where the distortions of background sources are much smaller and can only be detected by analyzing large numbers of sources in a statistical way to find coherent distortions of only a few percent. The lensing shows up statistically as a preferred stretching of the background objects perpendicular to the direction to the centre of the lens. By measuring the shapes and orientations of large numbers of distant galaxies, their orientations can be averaged to measure the shear of the lensing field in any region. This, in turn, can be used to reconstruct the mass distribution in the area: in particular, the background distribution of dark matter can be reconstructed. Since galaxies are intrinsically elliptical and the weak gravitational lensing signal is small, a very large number of galaxies must be used in these surveys. These weak lensing surveys must carefully avoid a number of important sources of systematic error: the intrinsic shape of galaxies, the tendency of a camera's point spread function to distort the shape of a galaxy and the tendency of atmospheric seeing to distort images must be understood and carefully accounted for. The results of these surveys are important for cosmological parameter estimation, to better understand and improve upon the Lambda-CDM model, and to provide a consistency check on other cosmological observations. They may also provide an important future constraint on dark energy.
Microlensing
Where no distortion in shape can be seen but the amount of light received from a background object changes in time. The lensing object may be stars in the Milky Way in one typical case, with the background source being stars in a remote galaxy, or, in another case, an even more distant quasar. In extreme cases, a star in a distant galaxy can act as a microlens and magnify another star much farther away. The first example of this was the star MACS J1149 Lensed Star 1 (also known as Icarus), thanks to the boost in flux due to the microlensing effect.

Gravitational lenses act equally on all kinds of electromagnetic radiation, not just visible light, and also on non-electromagnetic radiation, like gravitational waves. Weak lensing effects are being studied for the cosmic microwave background as well as galaxy surveys. Strong lenses have been observed in radio and x-ray regimes as well. If a strong lens produces multiple images, there will be a relative time delay between two paths: that is, in one image the lensed object will be observed before the other image.

== History ==
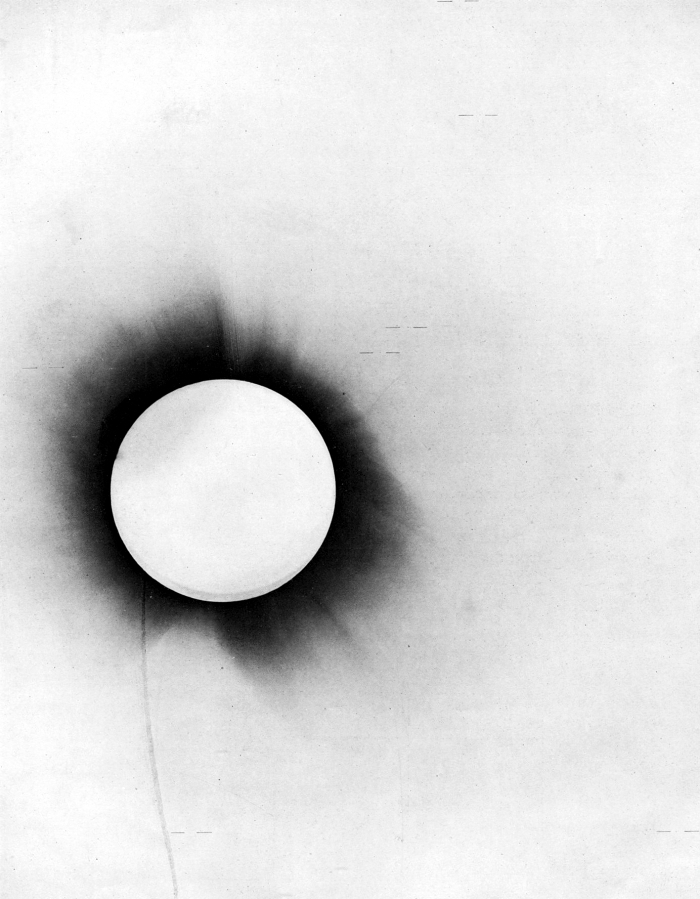
One of Eddington's photographs of the 1919 solar eclipse experiment, presented in his 1920 paper announcing its success

Henry Cavendish in 1784 (in an unpublished manuscript) and Johann Georg von Soldner in 1801 (published in 1804) had pointed out that Newtonian gravity predicts that starlight will bend around a massive object as had already been supposed by Isaac Newton in 1704 in his Queries No.1 in his book Opticks. The same value as Soldner's was calculated by Einstein in 1911 based on the equivalence principle alone. However, Einstein noted in 1915, in the process of completing general relativity, that his (and thus Soldner's) 1911-result is only half of the correct value. Einstein became the first to calculate the correct value for light bending.

The first observation of light deflection was performed by noting the change in position of stars as they passed near the Sun on the celestial sphere. The observations were performed in 1919 by Arthur Eddington, Frank Watson Dyson, and their collaborators during the total solar eclipse on May 29. The solar eclipse allowed the stars near the Sun to be observed. Observations were made simultaneously in the cities of Sobral, Ceará, Brazil and in São Tomé and Príncipe on the west coast of Africa. The observations demonstrated that the light from stars passing close to the Sun was slightly bent, so that stars appeared slightly out of position.

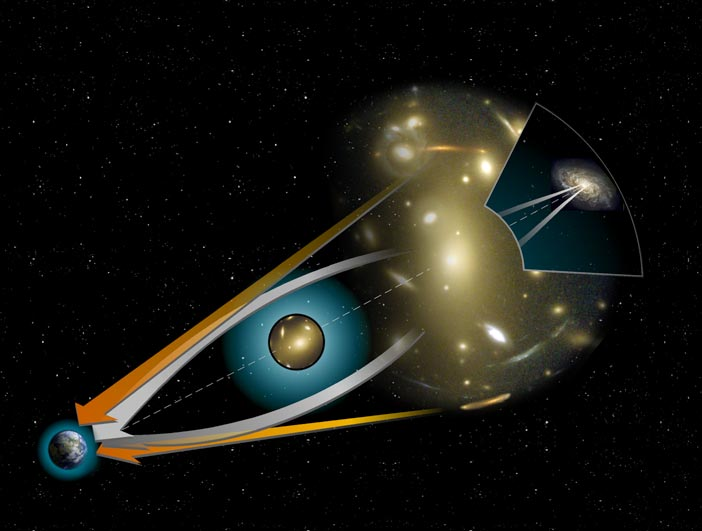
Bending light around a massive object from a distant source. The orange arrows show the apparent position of the background source. The white arrows show the path of the light from the true position of the source.

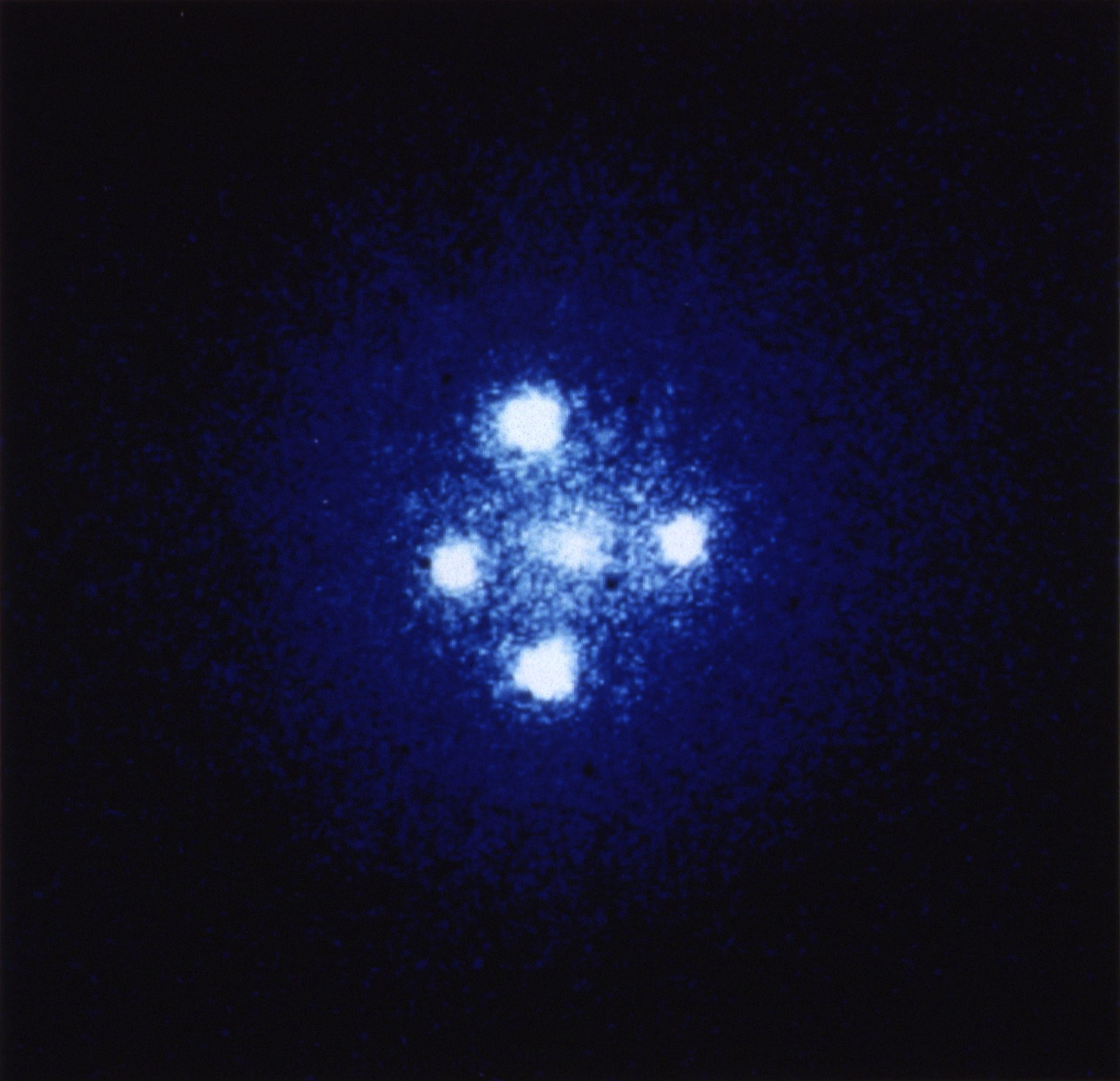
In the formation known as Einstein's Cross, four images of the same distant quasar appear around a foreground galaxy due to strong gravitational lensing.

The result was considered spectacular news and made the front page of most major newspapers. It made Einstein and his theory of general relativity world-famous. When asked by his assistant what his reaction would have been if general relativity had not been confirmed by Eddington and Dyson in 1919, Einstein said "Then I would feel sorry for the dear Lord. The theory is correct anyway." In 1912, Einstein had speculated that an observer could see multiple images of a single light source, if the light were deflected around a mass. This effect would make the mass act as a kind of gravitational lens. However, as he only considered the effect of deflection around a single star, he seemed to conclude that the phenomenon was unlikely to be observed for the foreseeable future since the necessary alignments between stars and observer would be highly improbable. Several other physicists speculated about gravitational lensing as well, but all reached the same conclusion that it would be nearly impossible to observe.

Although Einstein made unpublished calculations on the subject, the first discussion of the gravitational lens in print was by Khvolson, in a short article discussing the "halo effect" of gravitation when the source, lens, and observer are in near-perfect alignment, now referred to as the Einstein ring.

In 1936, after some urging by Rudi W. Mandl, Einstein reluctantly published the short article "Lens-Like Action of a Star By the Deviation of Light In the Gravitational Field" in the journal Science.

In 1937, Fritz Zwicky first considered the case where the newly discovered galaxies (which were called 'nebulae' at the time) could act as both source and lens, and that, because of the mass and sizes involved, the effect was much more likely to be observed.

In 1963 Yu. G. Klimov, S. Liebes, and Sjur Refsdal recognized independently that quasars are an ideal light source for the gravitational lens effect.

It was not until 1979 that the first gravitational lens would be discovered. It became known as the "Twin QSO" since it initially looked like two identical quasistellar objects. (It is officially named SBS 0957+561.) This gravitational lens was discovered by Dennis Walsh, Bob Carswell, and Ray Weymann using the Kitt Peak National Observatory 2.1 meter telescope.

In the 1980s, astronomers realized that the combination of CCD imagers and computers would allow the brightness of millions of stars to be measured each night. In a dense field, such as the galactic center or the Magellanic clouds, many microlensing events per year could potentially be found. This led to efforts such as Optical Gravitational Lensing Experiment, or OGLE, that have characterized hundreds of such events, including those of OGLE-2016-BLG-1190Lb and OGLE-2016-BLG-1195Lb.

== Approximate Newtonian description ==
Newton wondered whether light, in the form of corpuscles, would be bent due to gravity. The Newtonian prediction for light deflection refers to the amount of deflection a corpuscle would feel under the effect of gravity, and therefore one should read "Newtonian" in this context as the referring to the following calculations and not a belief that Newton held in the validity of these calculations.

For a gravitational point-mass lens of mass $M$, a corpuscle of mass $m$ feels a force

$$\vec F = -\frac{GMm}{r^2} \hat r,$$

where $r$ is the lens-corpuscle separation. If we equate this force with Newton's second law, we can solve for the acceleration that the light undergoes:

$$\vec a = -\frac{GM}{r^2} \hat r.$$

The light interacts with the lens from initial time $t = 0$ to $t$, and the velocity boost the corpuscle receives is

$$\Delta \vec v = -\int_0^t dt'\, \frac{GM}{r(t')^2} \hat r(t').$$

If one assumes that initially the light is far enough from the lens to neglect gravity, the perpendicular distance between the light's initial trajectory and the lens is b (the impact parameter), and the parallel distance is $r_\parallel$, such that $r^2 = b^2 + r_\parallel^2$. We additionally assume a constant speed of light along the parallel direction, $dr_\parallel \approx c\,dt$, and that the light is only being deflected a small amount. After plugging these assumptions into the above equation and further simplifying, one can solve for the velocity boost in the perpendicular direction. The angle of deflection between the corpuscle's initial and final trajectories is therefore (see, e.g., M. Meneghetti 2021)

$$\theta = \frac{2GM}{c^2 r}.$$

Although this result appears to be half the prediction from general relativity, classical physics predicts that the speed of light $c$ is observer-dependent (see, e.g., L. Susskind and A. Friedman 2018) which was superseded by a universal speed of light in special relativity.

== Explanation in terms of spacetime curvature ==
Simulated gravitational lensing (black hole passing in front of a background galaxy)

In general relativity, light follows the curvature of spacetime, hence when light passes around a massive object, it is bent. This means that the light from an object on the other side will be bent towards an observer's eye, just like an ordinary lens. In general relativity the path of light depends on the shape of space (i.e. the metric). The gravitational attraction can be viewed as the motion of undisturbed objects in a background curved geometry or alternatively as the response of objects to a force in a flat geometry. The angle of deflection is

$$\theta = \frac{4GM}{c^2 r}$$

toward the mass M at a distance r from the affected radiation, where G is the universal constant of gravitation, and c is the speed of light in vacuum.

Since the Schwarzschild radius $r_\text{s}$ is defined as $r_\text{s} = 2Gm/c^2$, and escape velocity $v_\text{e}$ is defined as $v_\text{e} = \sqrt{2Gm/r} = \beta_\text{e} c$, this can also be expressed in simple form as

$$\theta = 2 \frac{r_\text{s}}{r} = 2 \left(\frac{v_\text{e}}{c}\right)^2 = 2\beta_\text{e}^2.$$

== Search for gravitational lenses ==
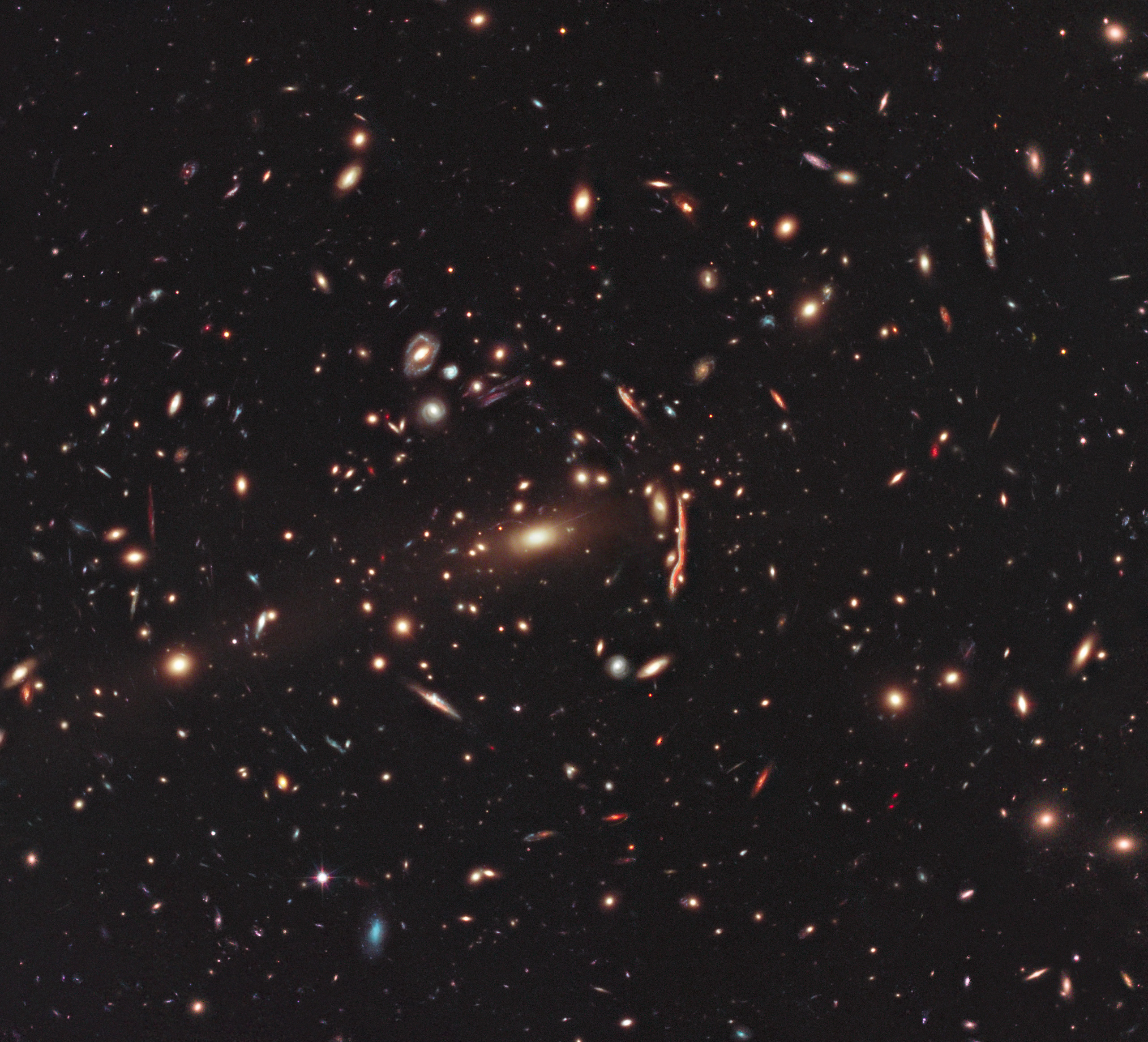
This image from the NASA/ESA Hubble Space Telescope shows the galaxy cluster MACS J1206.

Creating statistically reliable and complete samples of lens systems is far from easy. Lens systems can be missed for various reasons, including the overlap between lensed images and lensing galaxies, low contrast, or extended radio structure in the lensed source.

In 2002, a comprehensive study on the combination of two northern hemisphere surveys, the Cosmic Lens All Sky Survey (CLASS) and the Jodrell-Bank VLA Astrometric Survey (JVAS), done in radio frequencies using the Very Large Array (VLA), led to the discovery of 22 new lensing systems. Twelve were double-image systems, nine were four-image systems, and one was a six-image system.

A similar search in the southern hemisphere was conducted in 2012 using the Australia Telescope 20 GHz (AT20G) Survey data collected using the Australia Telescope Compact Array (ATCA). The AT20G survey is a blind survey at 20 GHz frequency in the radio domain of the electromagnetic spectrum. Due to the high frequency used, the chances of finding gravitational lenses increase as the relative number of compact core objects (e.g. quasars) are higher (Sadler et al. 2006). Lensing is easier to detect and identify in simple objects compared to objects with complexity in them. This search involved the use of interferometric methods to identify 4 candidates and follow them up at higher resolution to identify them.

In the 2020s, multiple surveys began to increase the number of confirmed gravitational lenses by orders of magnitude. The European Space Agency (ESA) 2023 launch of the Euclid Space Telescope found around 500 strong-lens candidates in the first 0.45% of its full survey area, with an expected 100,000 candidates to be found during its 6-year survey. Vera C. Rubin Observatory (LSST) began data collection in 2025 in Cerro Pachón, Chile. LSST expects to discover around 62,000 to 120,000 galaxy-scale lenses over its 10-year survey. The Nancy Grace Roman Space Telescope is expected to discover around 160,000 strong gravitational lenses through the planned High Latitude Wide Area Survey (HLWAS).

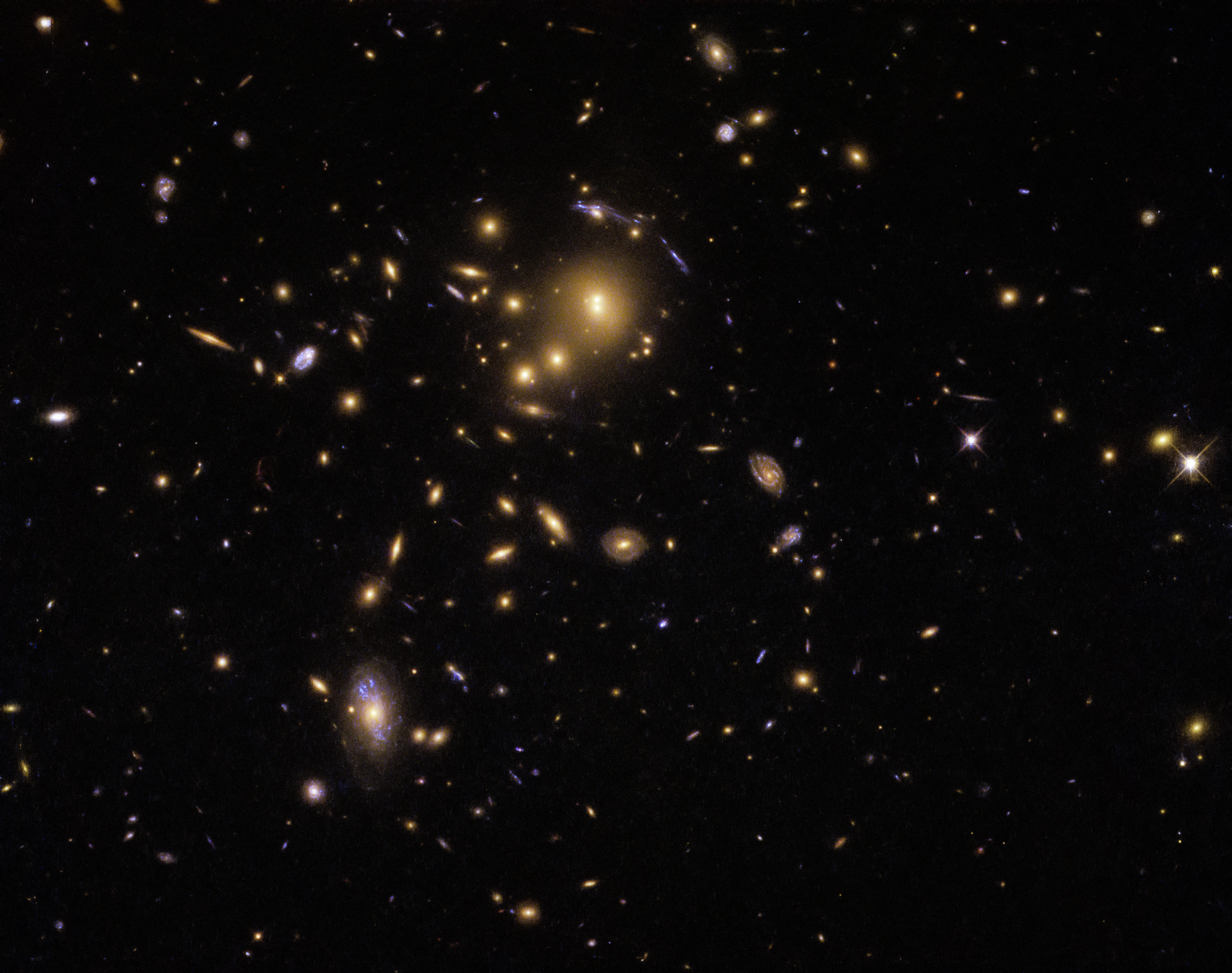
Galaxy cluster SDSS J0915+3826 helps astronomers to study star formation in galaxies.

Microlensing techniques have been used to search for planets outside the Solar System. A statistical analysis of specific cases of observed microlensing over the time period of 2002 to 2007 found that most stars in the Milky Way galaxy hosted at least one orbiting planet within 0.5 to 10 AU.

In 2009, weak gravitational lensing was used to extend the mass-X-ray-luminosity relation to older and smaller structures than was previously possible to improve measurements of distant galaxies.

As of 2013 the most distant gravitational lens galaxy, J1000+0221, had been found using NASA's Hubble Space Telescope. While it remains the most distant quad-image lensing galaxy known, an even more distant two-image lensing galaxy was subsequently discovered by an international team of astronomers using a combination of Hubble Space Telescope and Keck telescope imaging and spectroscopy. The discovery and analysis of the IRC 0218 lens was published in the Astrophysical Journal Letters on June 23, 2014.

In 2023, a massive galaxy with a complete Einstein ring at redshift z = 2 was identified in JWST NIRCam observations in the COSMOS-Web survey. The object, named JWST-ER1, is located approximately 17 billion light-years away, making it the most distant lensing galaxy observed to date. The compact, massive, quiescent galaxy (JWST-ER1g) is located at z_{phot} ~ 1.94, lenses an even farther background galaxy (JWST-ER1r) at z_{phot} ~ 2.98, creating the complete, luminous ring. JWST-ER1 is even more distant than the lenses mentioned above, J1000+0221 and IRC 0218, and its discovery and unusually high-density has important implications in understanding dark matter halos.

Research published September 30, 2013 in the online edition of Physical Review Letters, led by McGill University in Montreal, Québec, Canada, has discovered the B-modes, that are formed due to gravitational lensing effects, using National Science Foundation's South Pole Telescope and with help from the Herschel space observatory. This discovery would open the possibilities of testing the theories of how our universe originated.

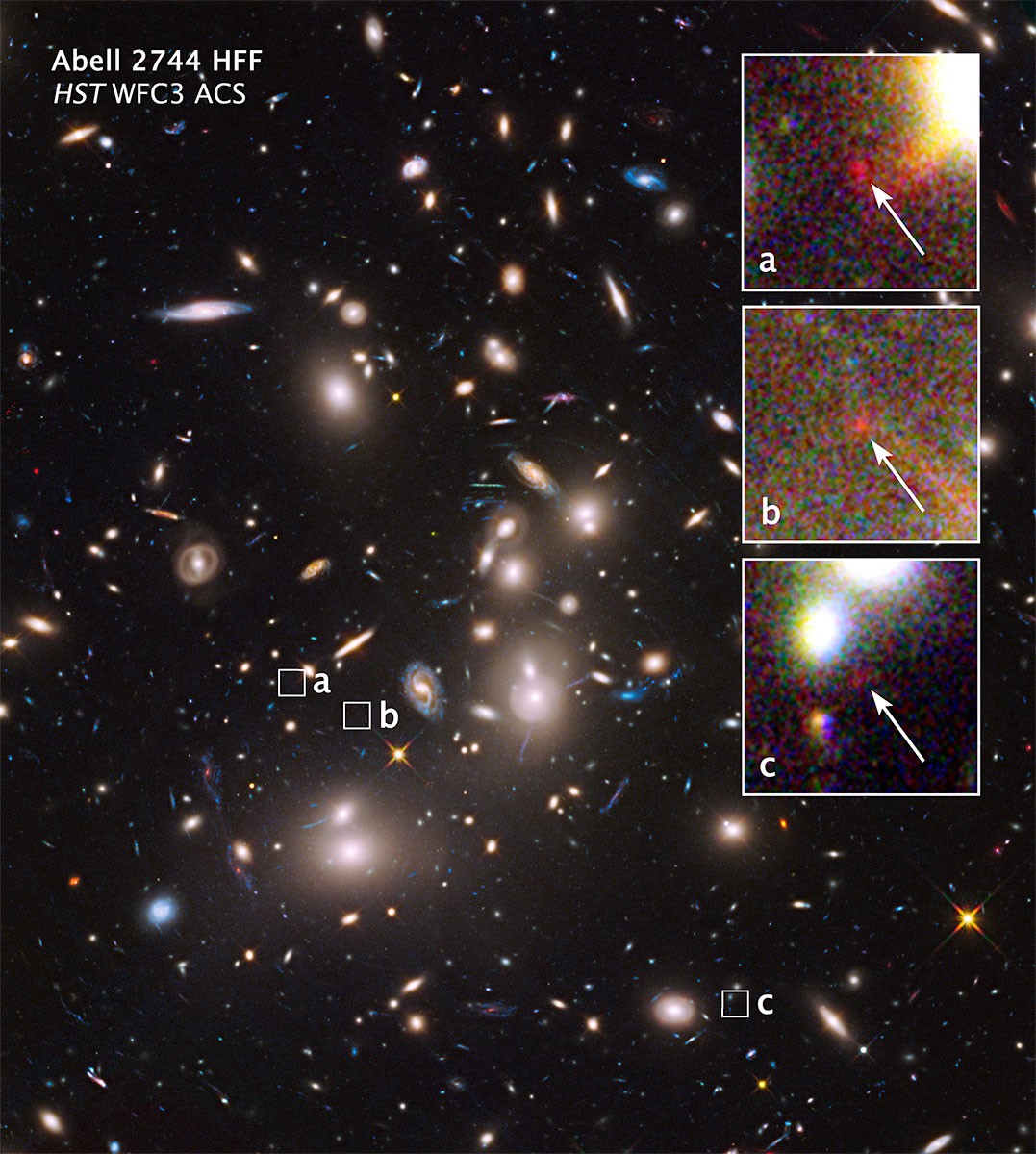
Abell 2744 galaxy cluster - extremely distant galaxies revealed by gravitational lensing (16 October 2014).

== Solar gravitational lens ==
Albert Einstein predicted in 1936 that rays of light from the same direction that skirt the edges of the Sun would converge to a focal point approximately 542 AU from the Sun. Thus, a probe positioned at this distance (or greater) from the Sun could use the Sun as a gravitational lens for magnifying distant objects on the opposite side of the Sun. A probe's location could shift around as needed to select different targets relative to the Sun.

This distance is far beyond the progress and equipment capabilities of space probes such as Voyager 1, and beyond the known planets and dwarf planets, though over thousands of years 90377 Sedna will move farther away on its highly elliptical orbit. The high gain for potentially detecting signals through this lens, such as microwaves at the 21-cm hydrogen line, led to the suggestion by Frank Drake in the early days of SETI that a probe could be sent to this distance. A multipurpose probe SETISAIL and later FOCAL was proposed to the ESA in 1993, but is expected to be a difficult task. If a probe does pass 542 AU, magnification capabilities of the lens will continue to act at farther distances, as the rays that come to a focus at larger distances pass further away from the distortions of the Sun's corona. A critique of the concept was given by Landis, who discussed issues including interference of the solar corona, the high magnification of the target, which will make the design of the mission focal plane difficult, and an analysis of the inherent spherical aberration of the lens.

In 2020, NASA physicist Slava Turyshev presented his idea of Direct Multipixel Imaging and Spectroscopy of an Exoplanet with a Solar Gravitational Lens Mission. The lens could reconstruct the exoplanet image with ~25 km-scale surface resolution, enough to see surface features and signs of habitability.

== Measuring weak lensing ==
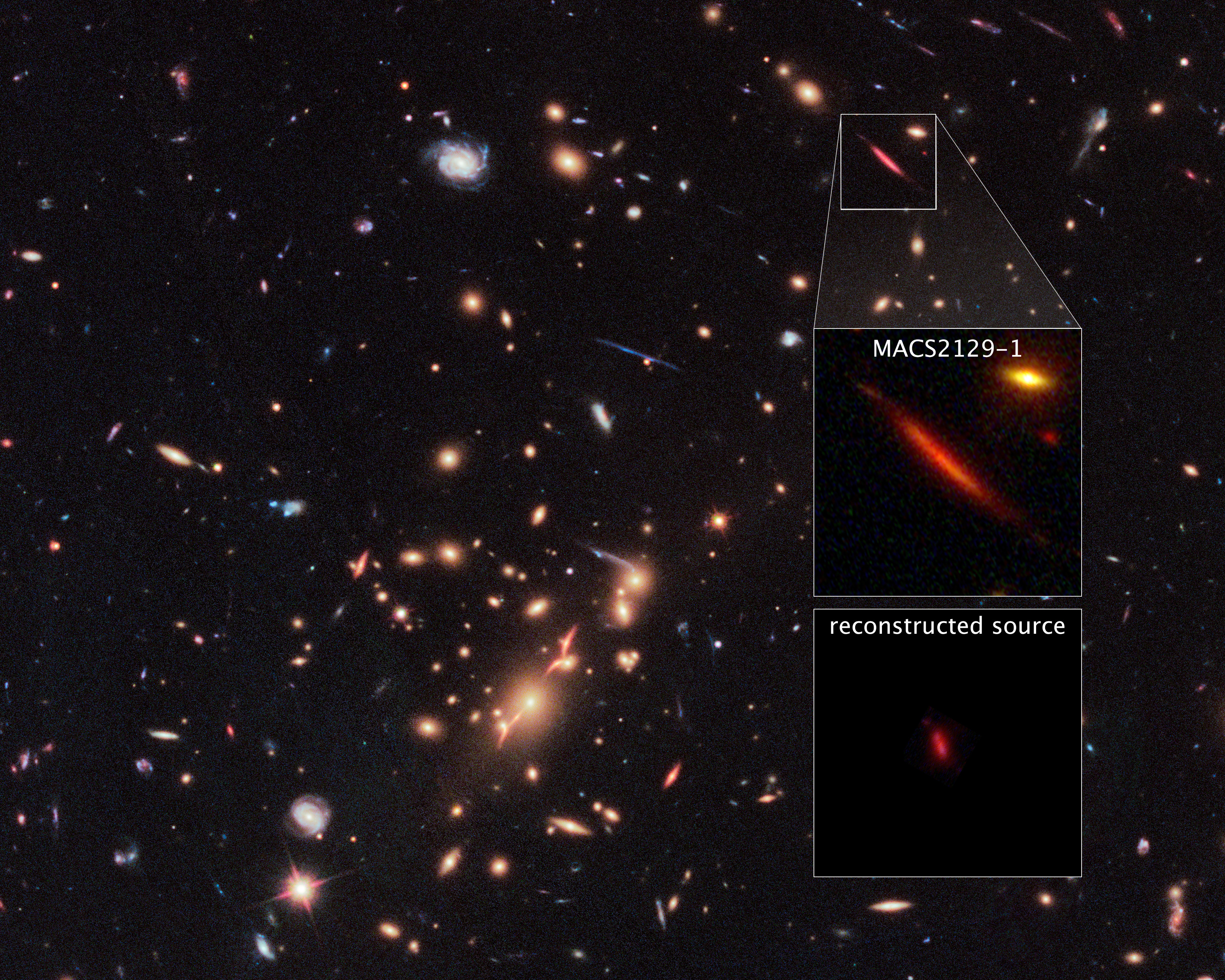
Galaxy cluster MACS J2129-0741 and lensed galaxy MACS2129-1.

Kaiser, Squires and Broadhurst (1995), Luppino & Kaiser (1997) and Hoekstra et al. (1998) prescribed a method to invert the effects of the point spread function (PSF) smearing and shearing, recovering a shear estimator uncontaminated by the systematic distortion of the PSF. This method (KSB+) is the most widely used method in weak lensing shear measurements.

Galaxies have random rotations and inclinations. As a result, the shear effects in weak lensing need to be determined by statistically preferred orientations. The primary source of error in lensing measurement is due to the convolution of the PSF with the lensed image. The KSB method measures the ellipticity of a galaxy image. The shear is proportional to the ellipticity. The objects in lensed images are parameterized according to their weighted quadrupole moments. For a perfect ellipse, the weighted quadrupole moments are related to the weighted ellipticity. KSB calculate how a weighted ellipticity measure is related to the shear and use the same formalism to remove the effects of the PSF.

KSB's primary advantages are its mathematical ease and relatively simple implementation. However, KSB is based on a key assumption that the PSF is circular with an anisotropic distortion. This is a reasonable assumption for cosmic shear surveys, but the next generation of surveys (e.g. LSST) may need much better accuracy than KSB can provide.

== Gallery ==
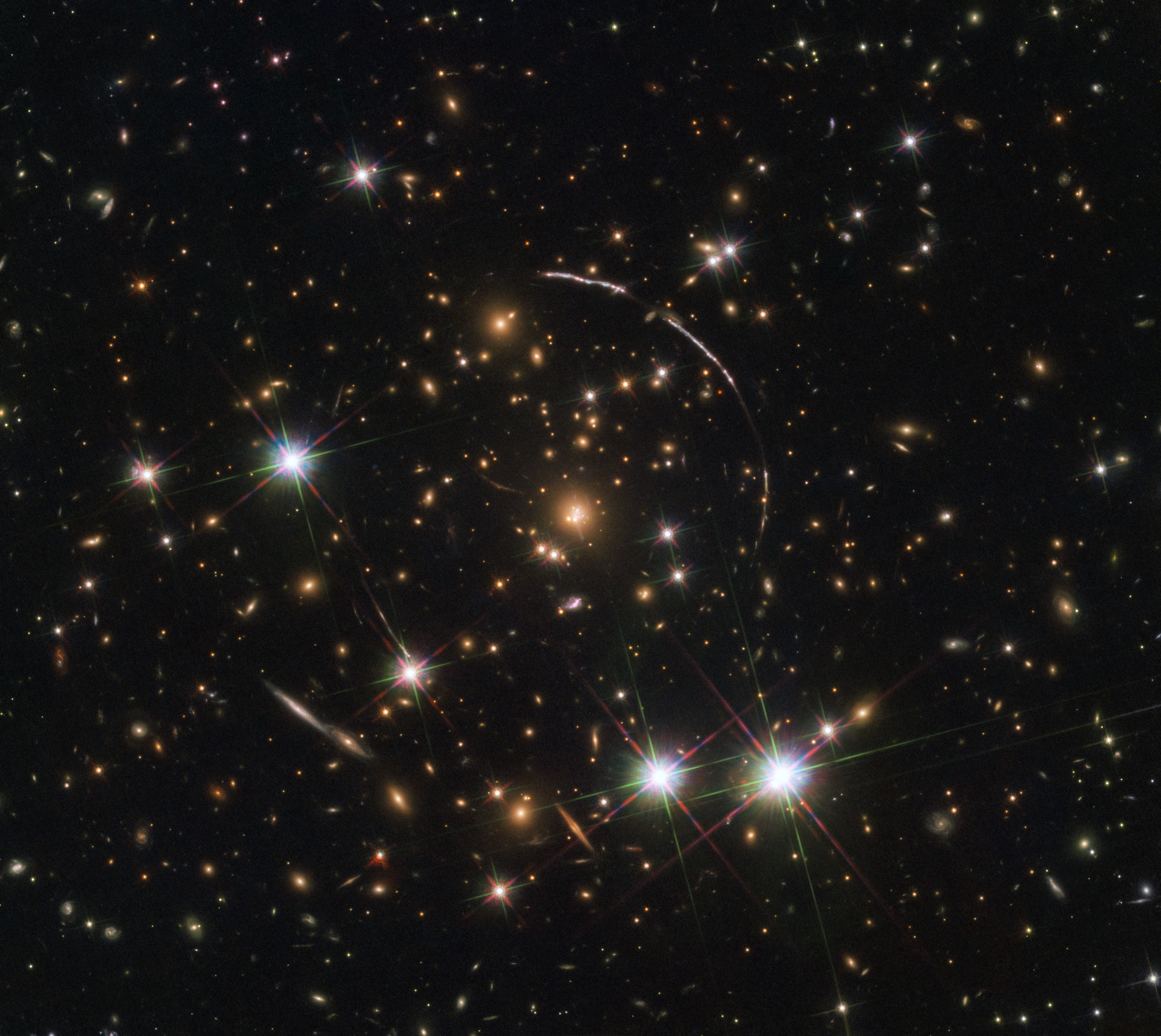
Sunburst Arc galaxy.

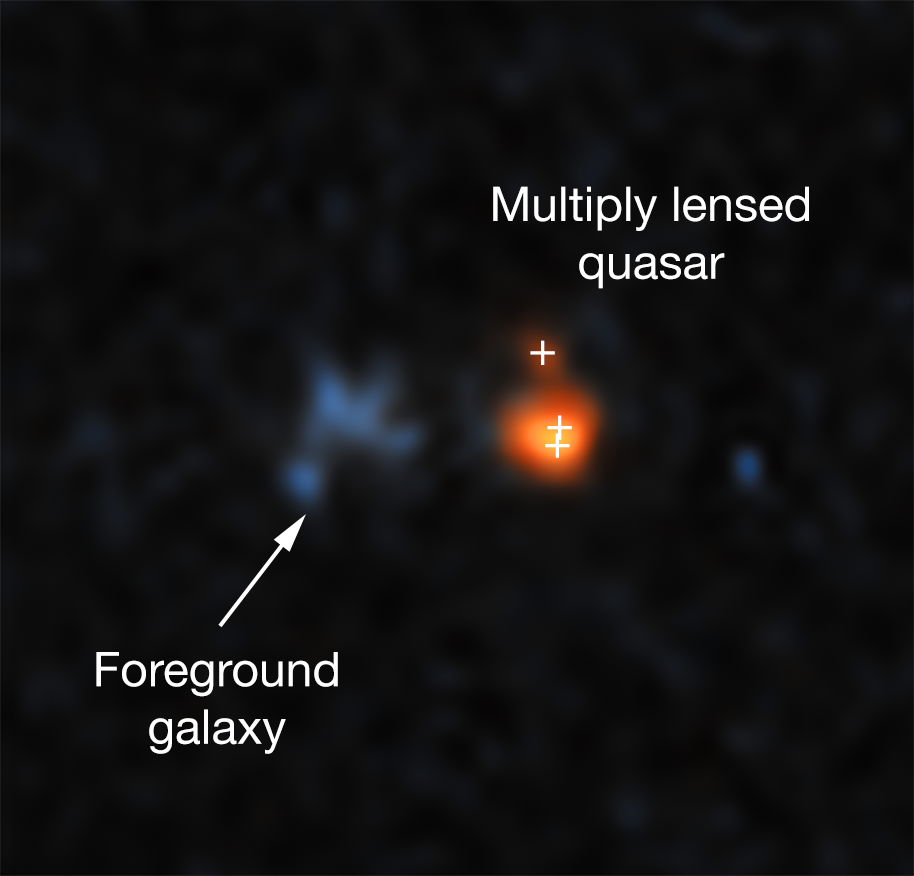
Gravitationally lensed Quasar.

Collection of galaxy-scale strong gravitational lenses from Euclid.

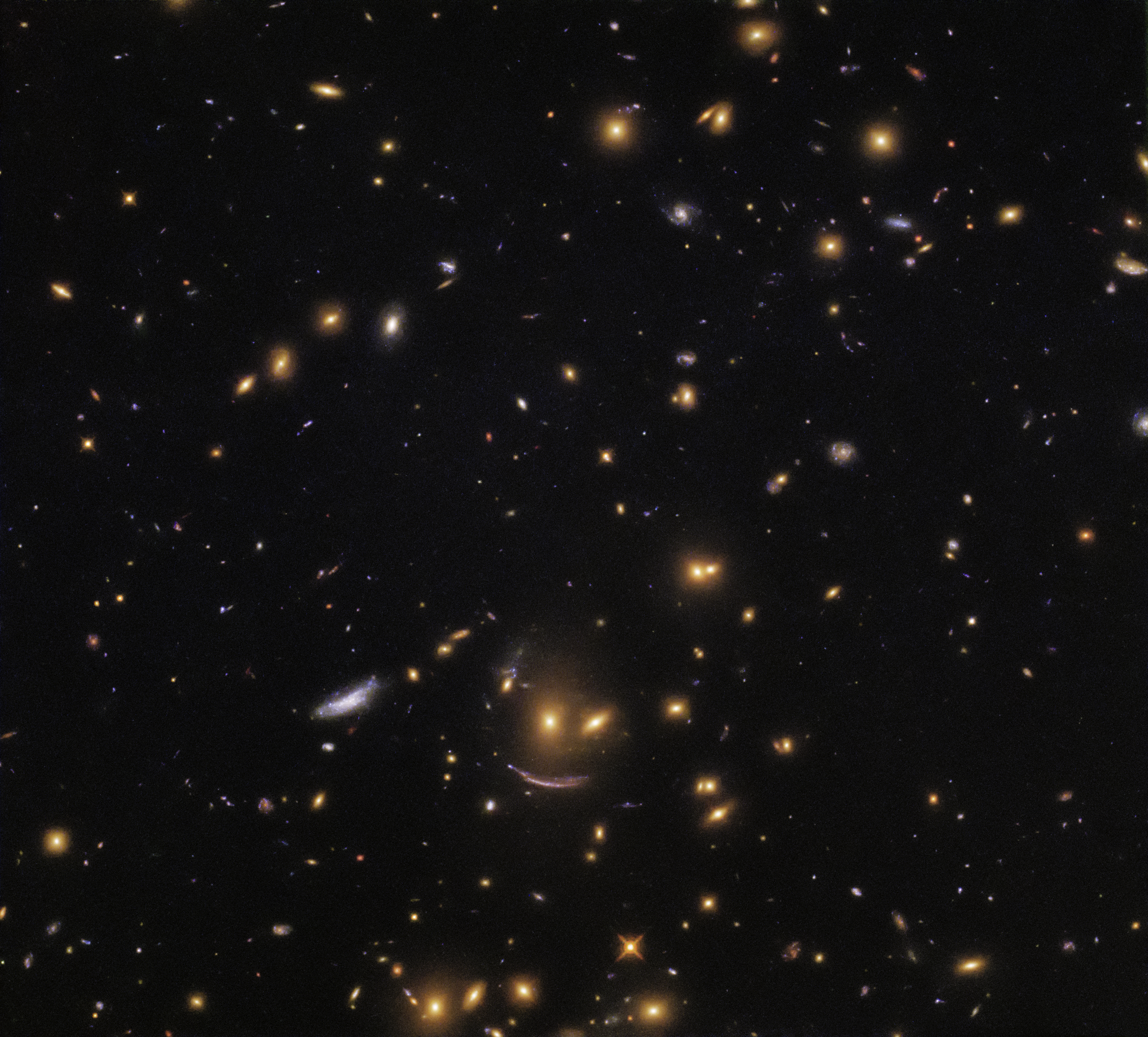
In SDSS J0952+3434, the lower arc-shaped galaxy has the characteristic shape of a galaxy that has been gravitationally lensed.

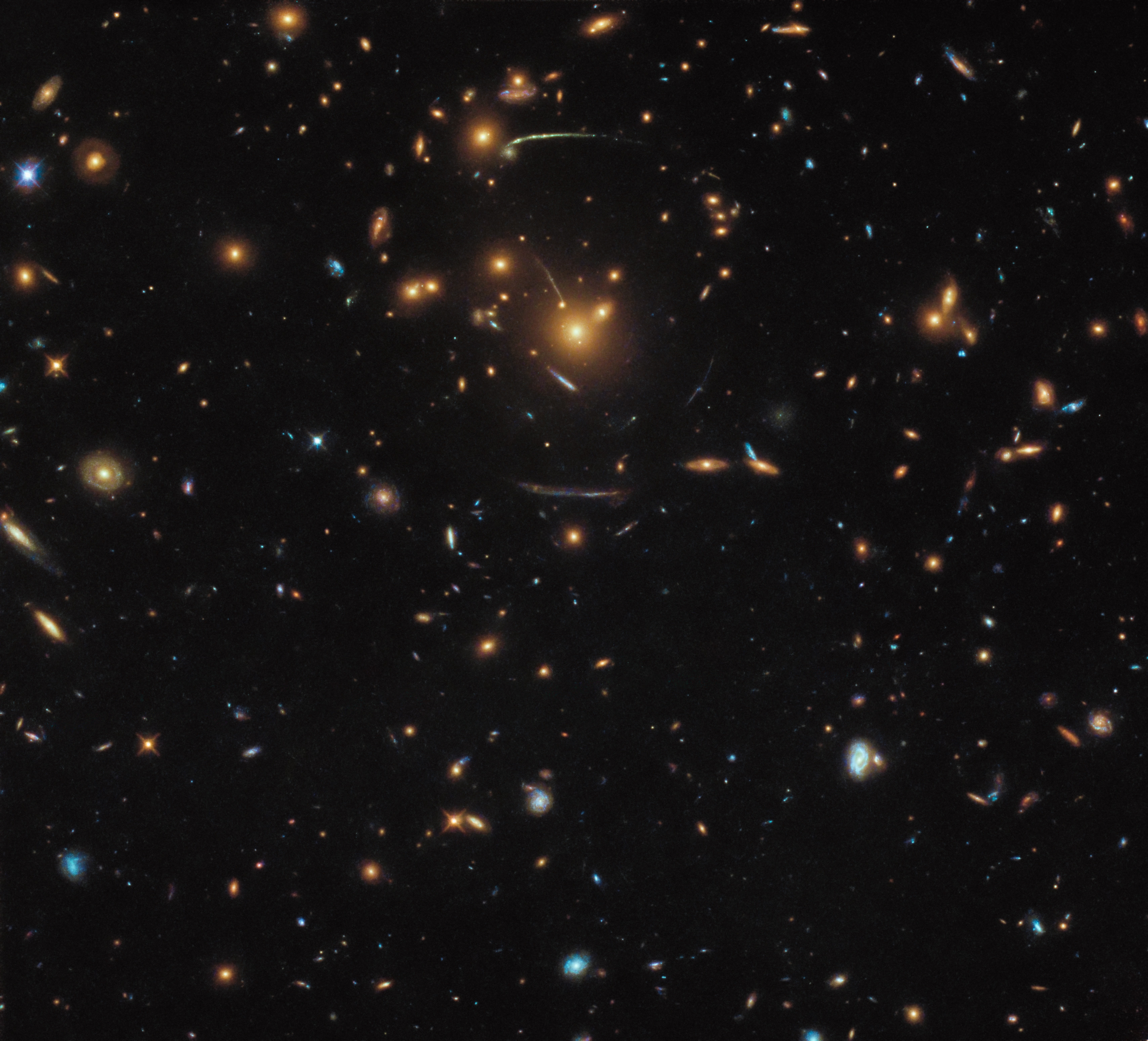
Warped and distorted around SDSS J1050+0017.

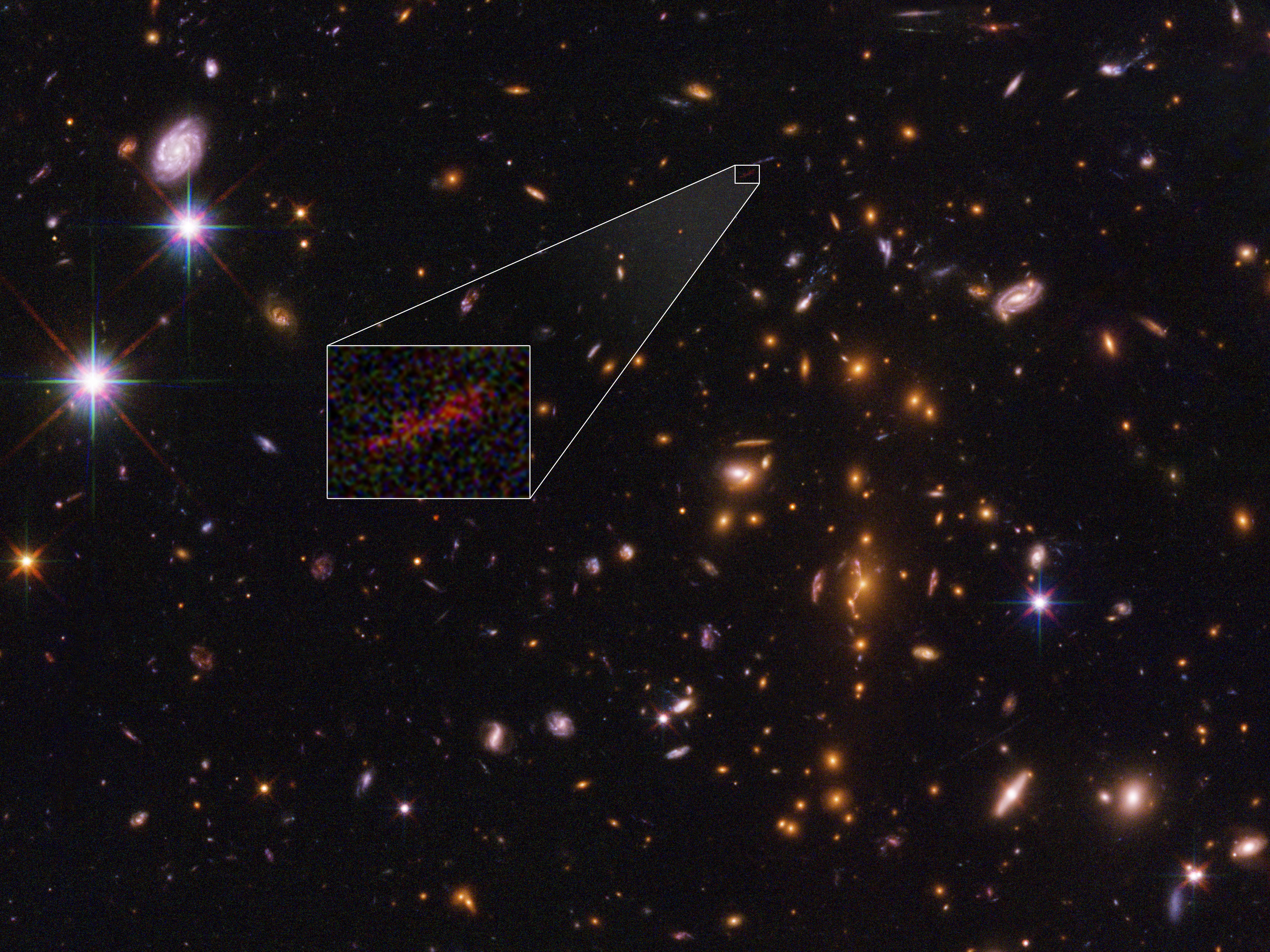
Galaxy SPT0615-JD existed when the Universe was just 500 million years old.

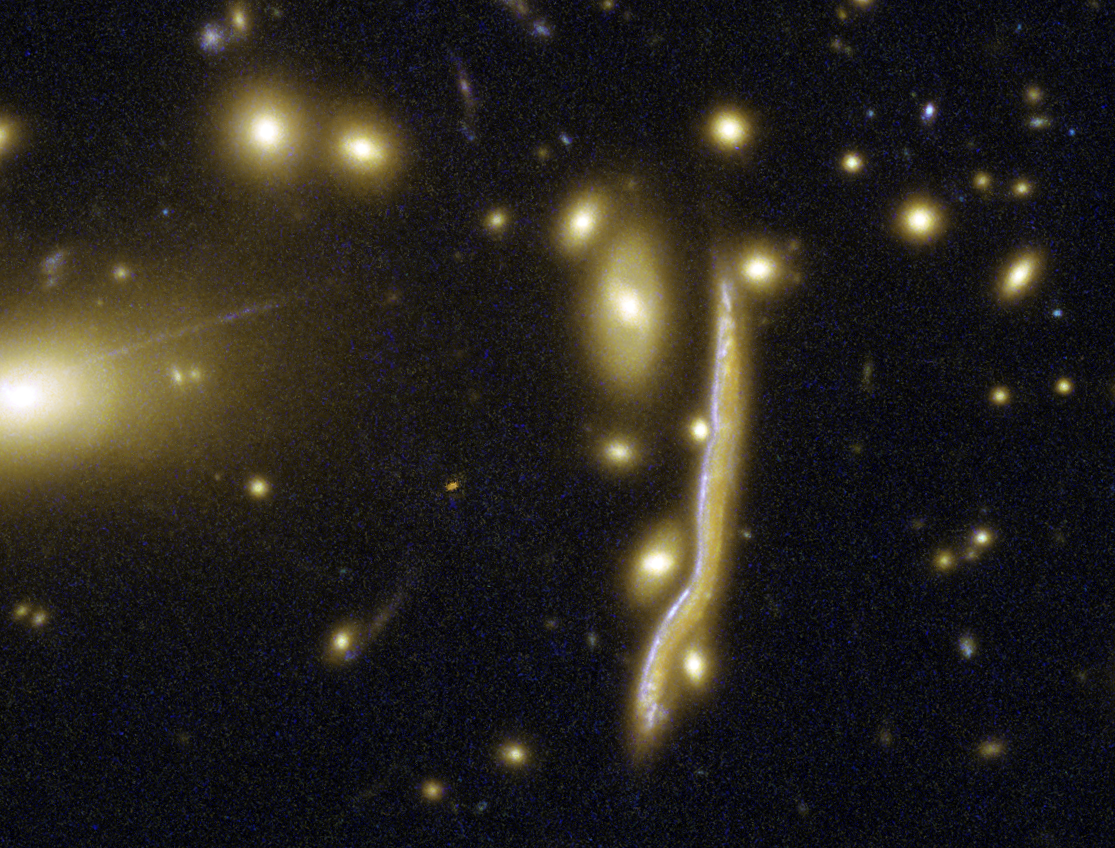
Gravitational lenses found in the DESI Legacy Survey data

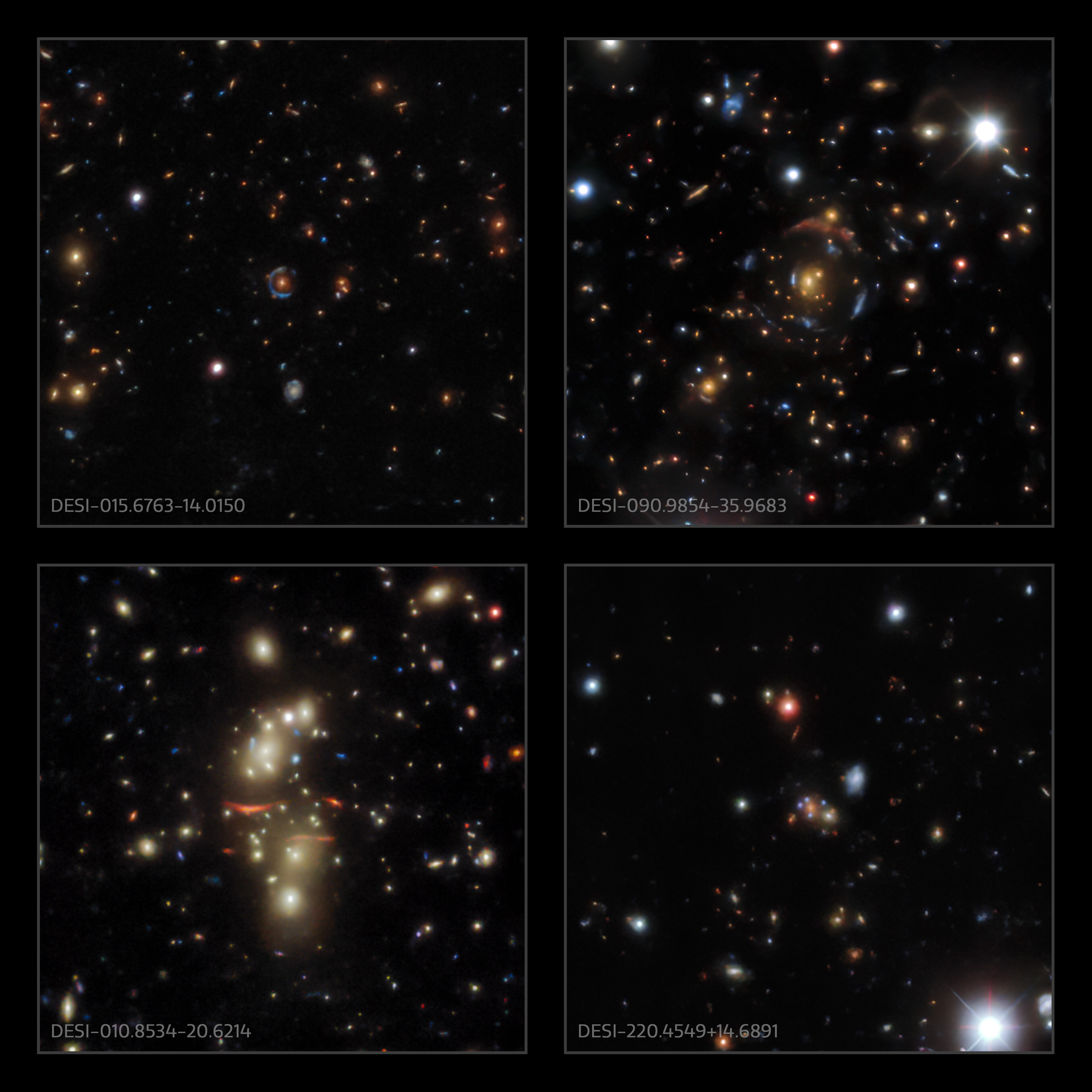
Gravitational lenses found in the DESI Legacy Survey data

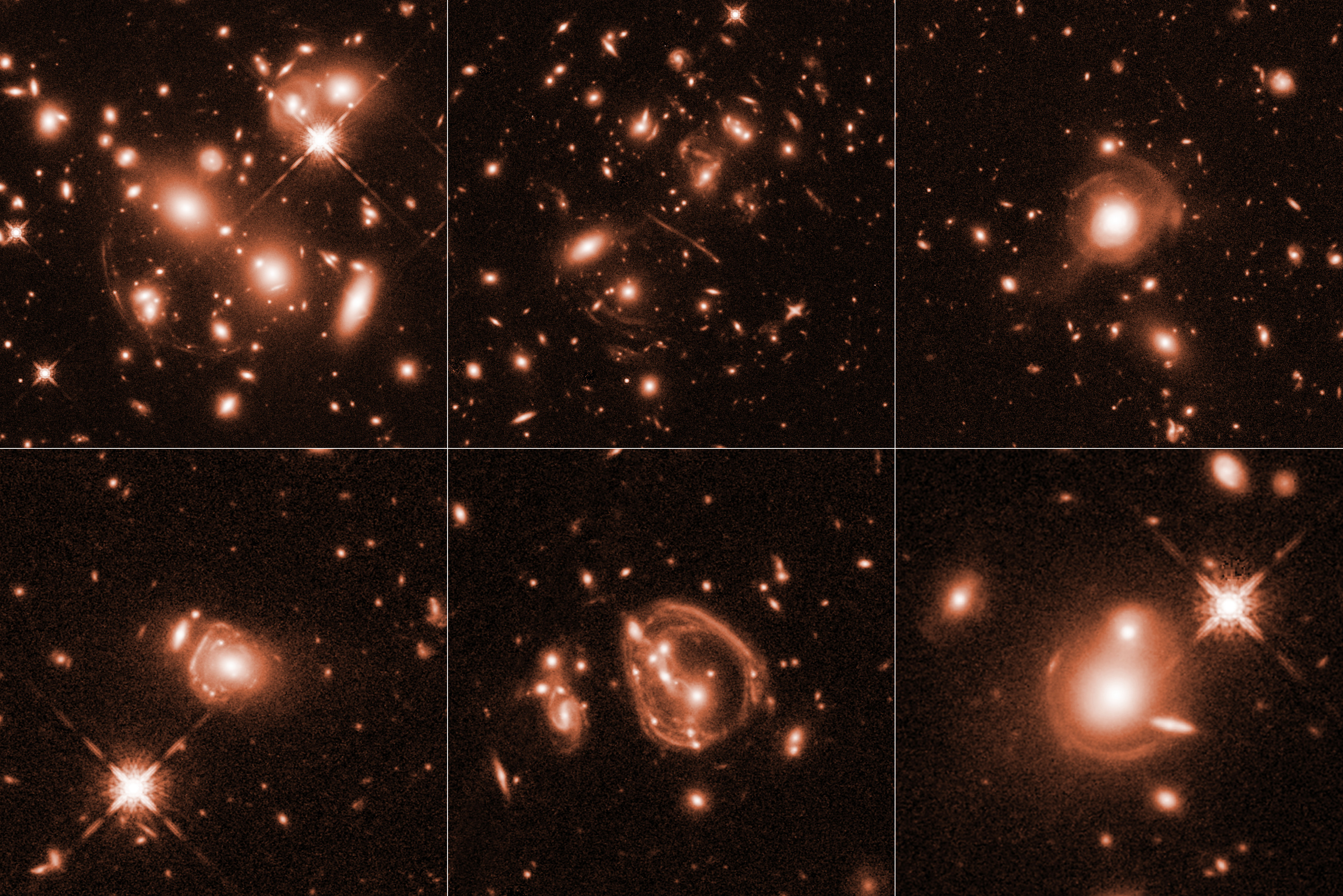
The lensing phenomenon allows for features as small as about 100 light-years or less.

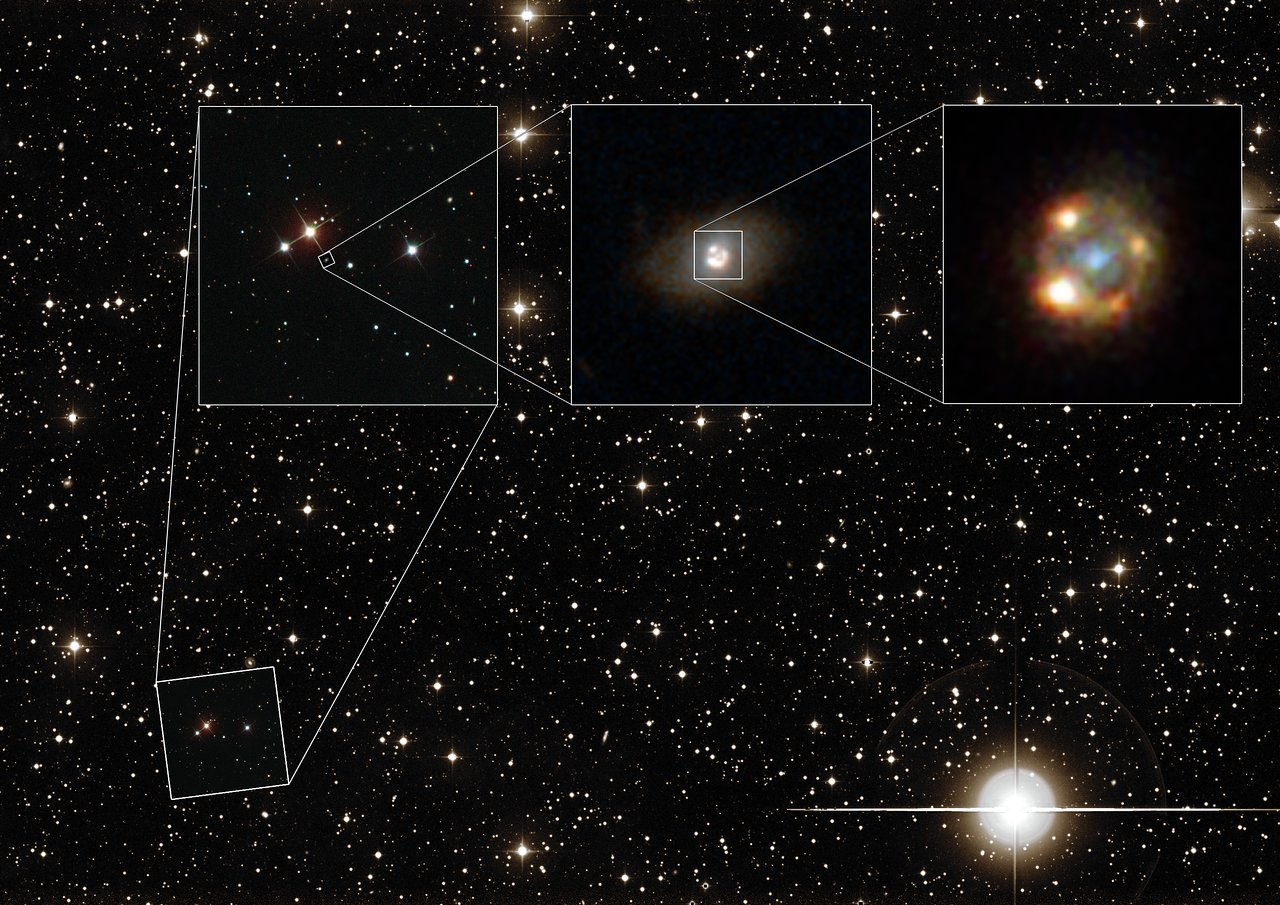
Detailed look at a gravitationally lensed type Ia supernova iPTF16geu.

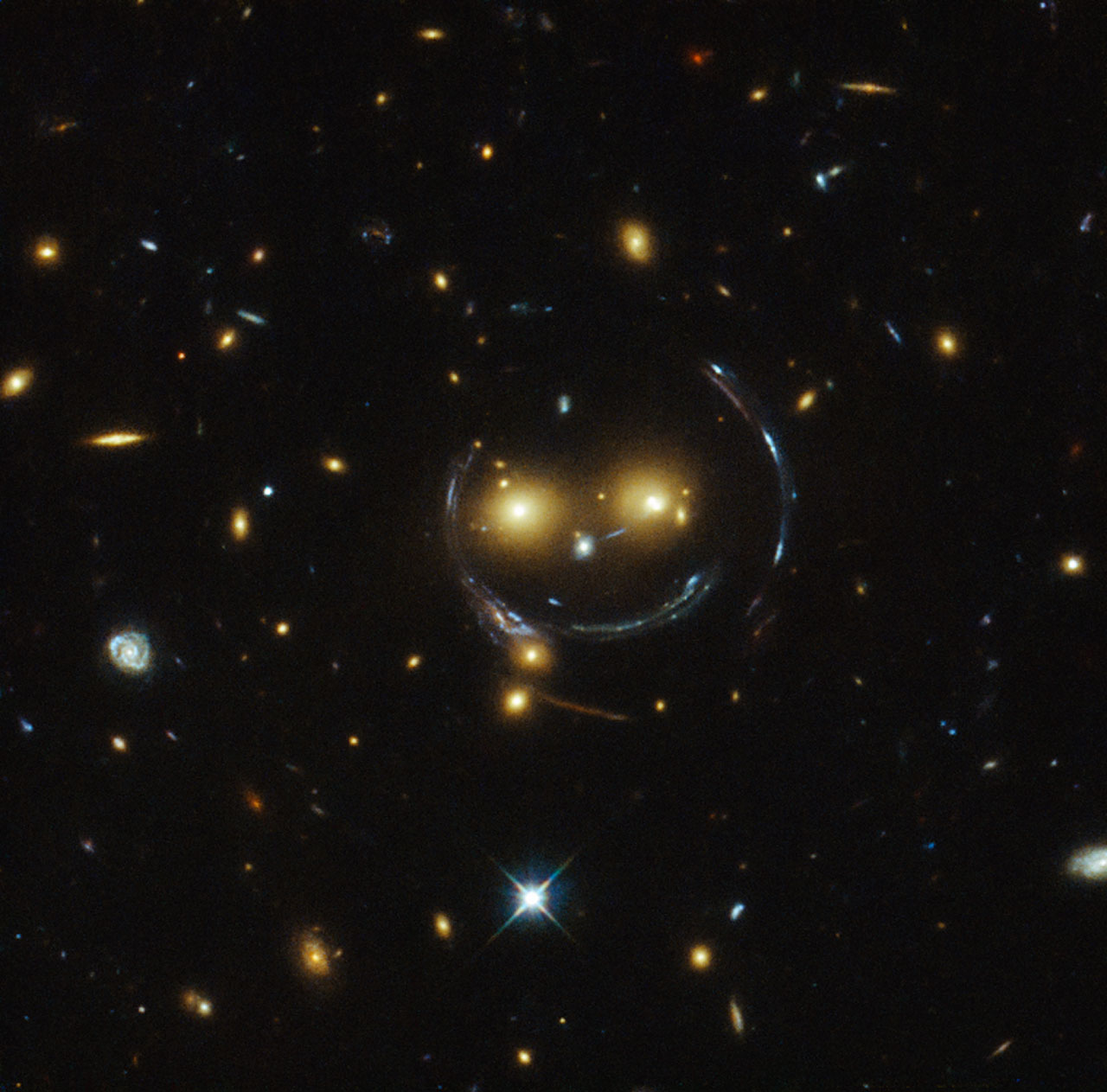
"Smiley" image of galaxy cluster (SDSS J1038+4849) & gravitational lensing (an Einstein ring) (HST).

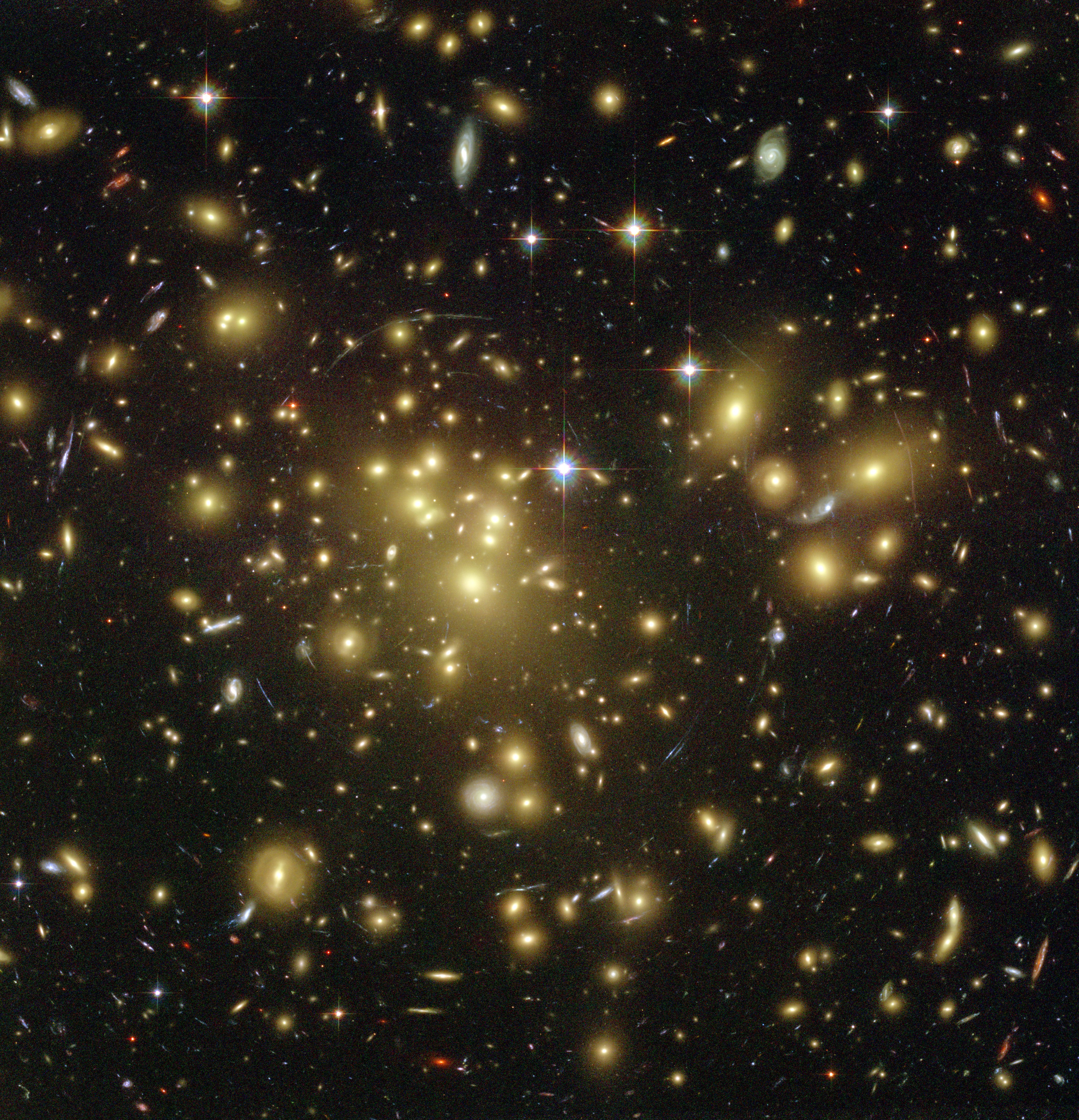
Abell 1689 - actual gravitational lensing effects (Hubble Space Telescope).

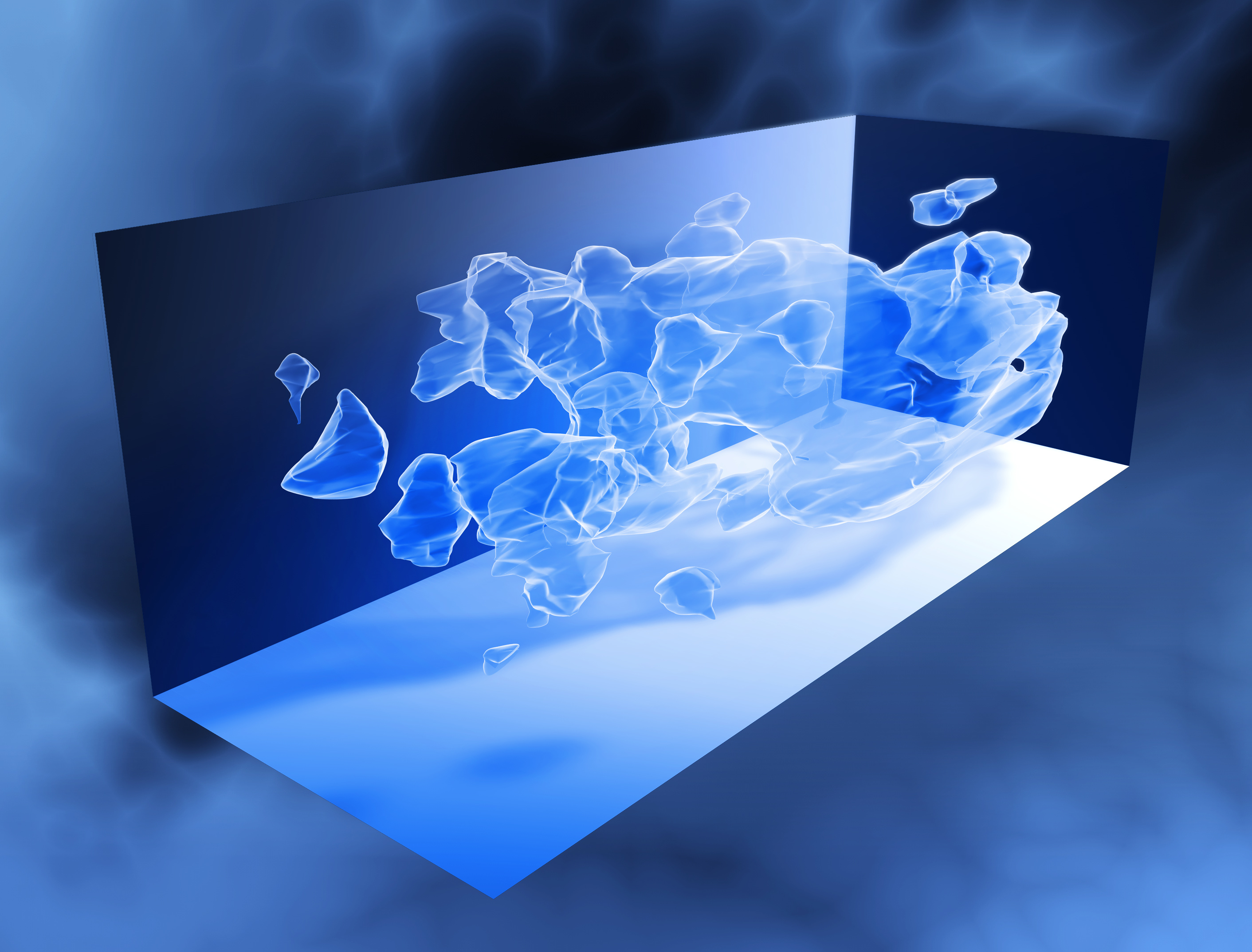
Dark matter distribution - weak gravitational lensing (Hubble Space Telescope).

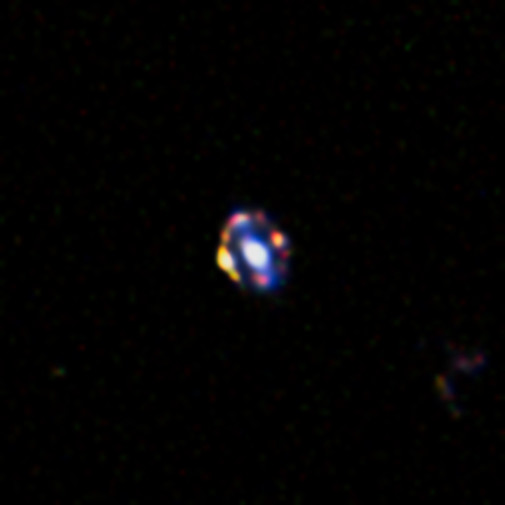
Gravitational lens discovered at redshift z = 1.53.

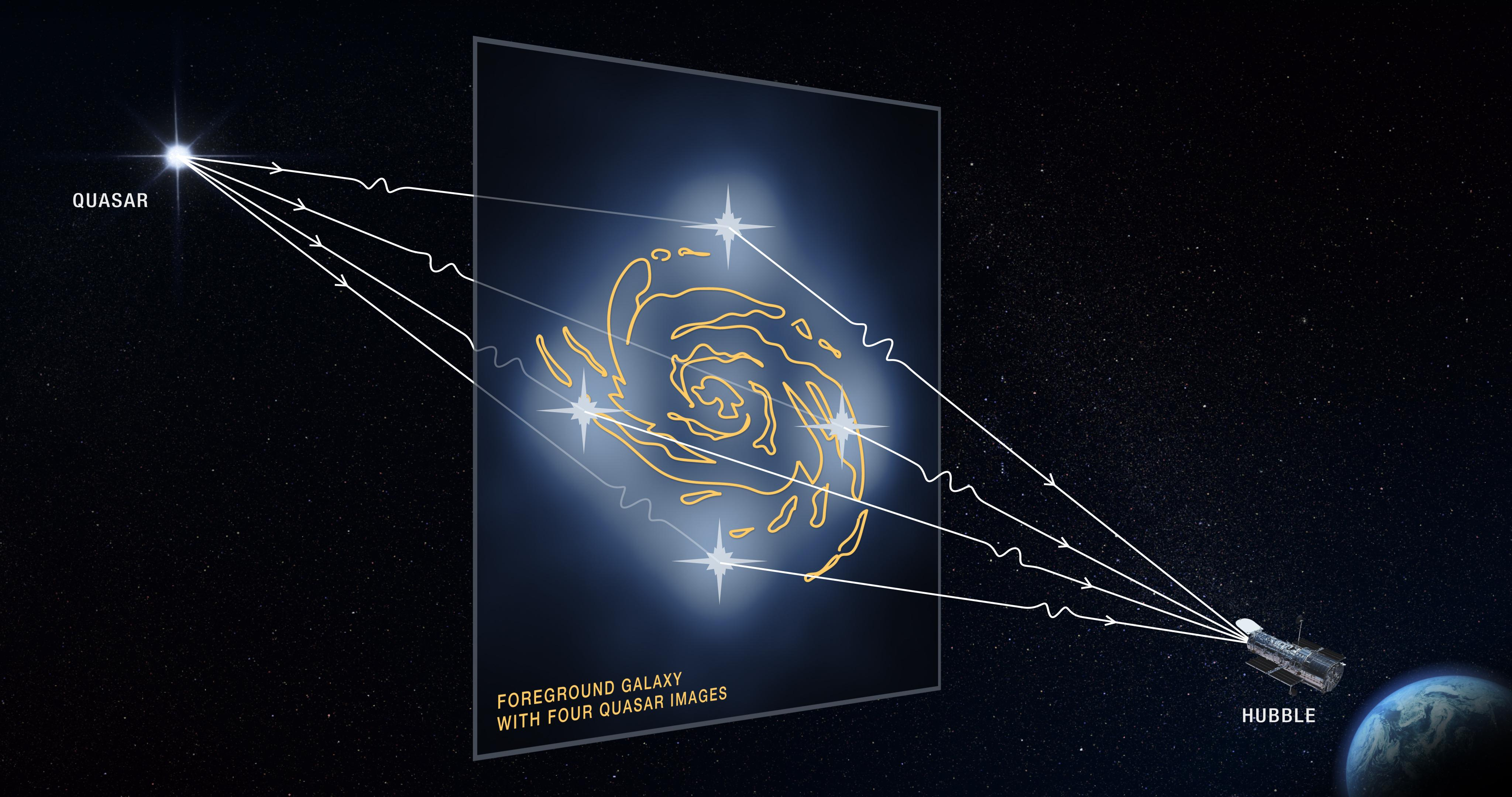
Gravitational Lensing Graphic (January 8, 2020)

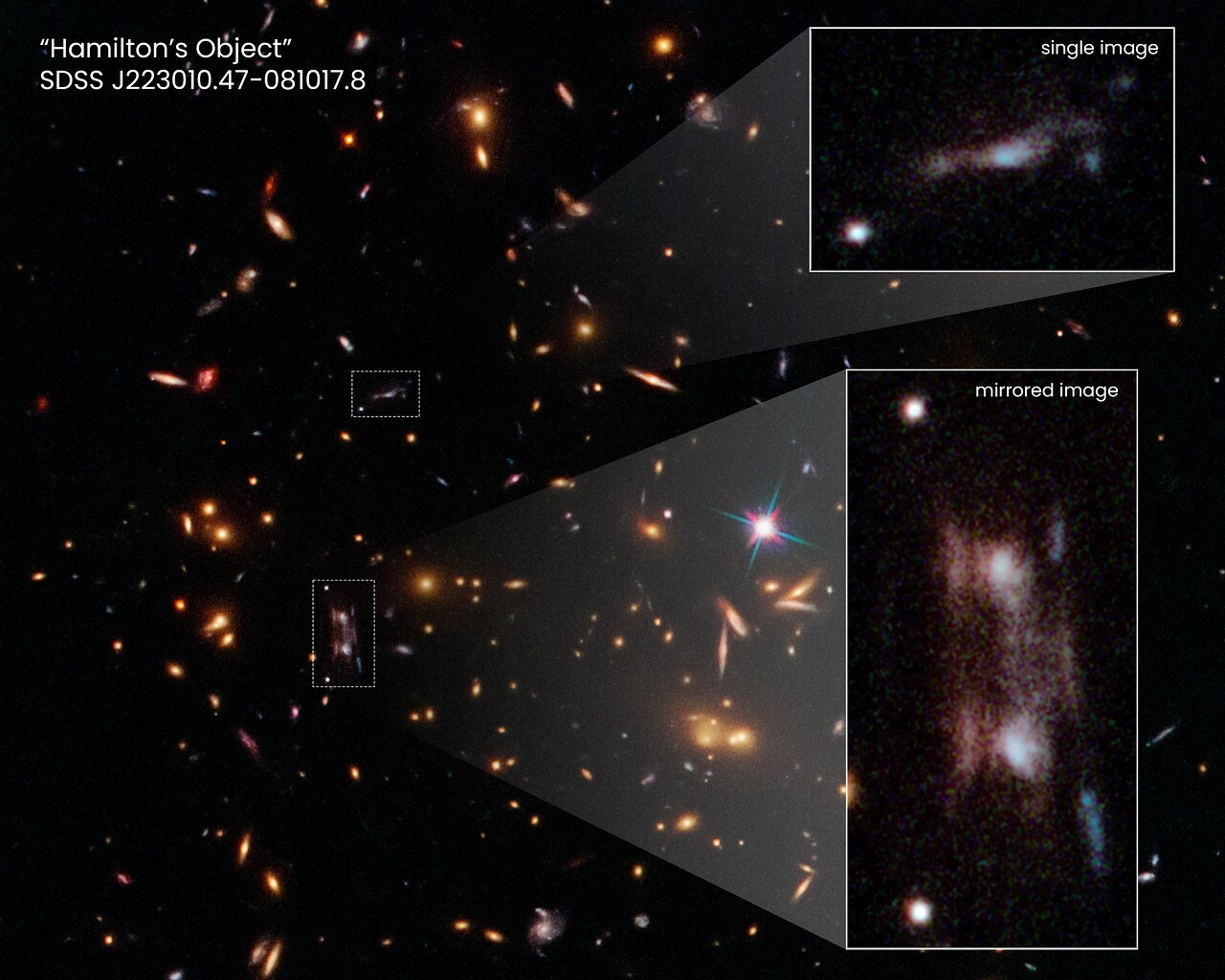
Hubble Showcases Hamilton's Object

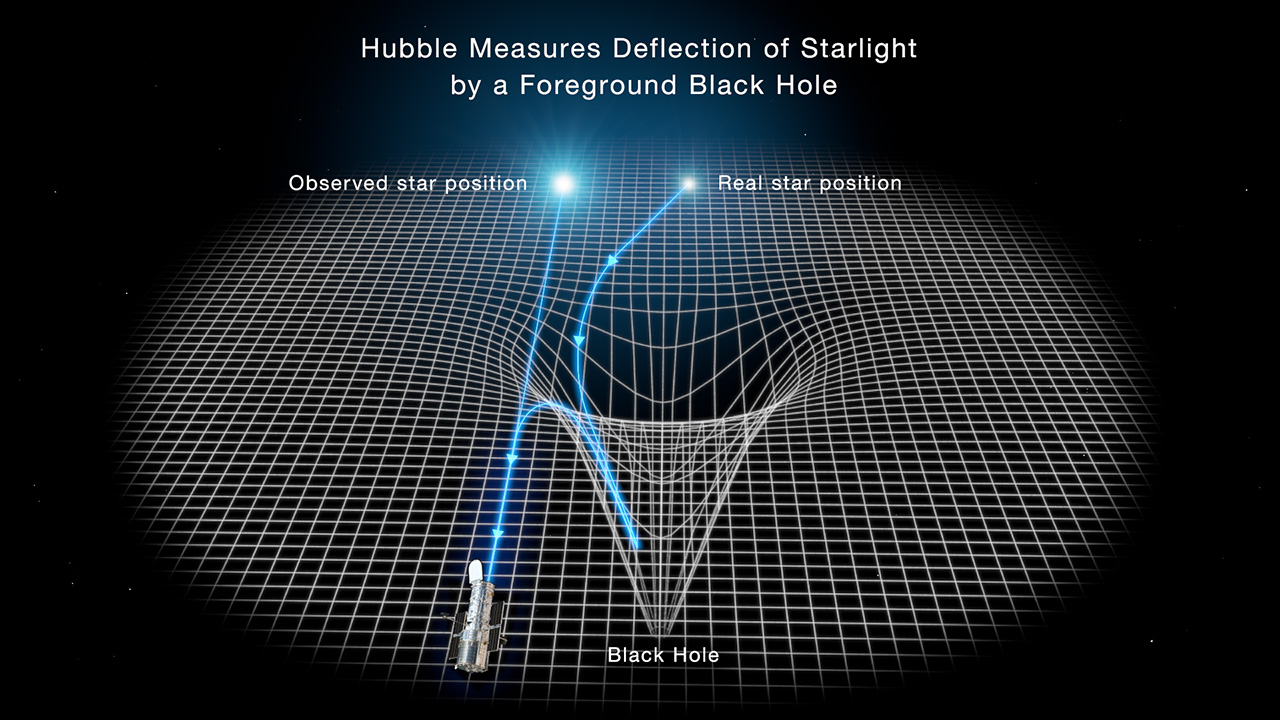
Illustration of gravitational lensing

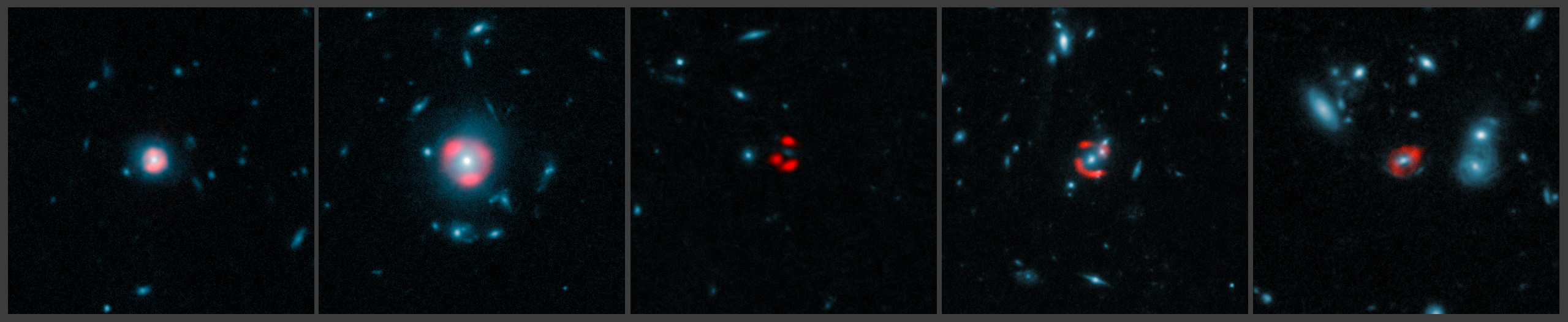
Gravitationally-lensed distant star-forming galaxies.

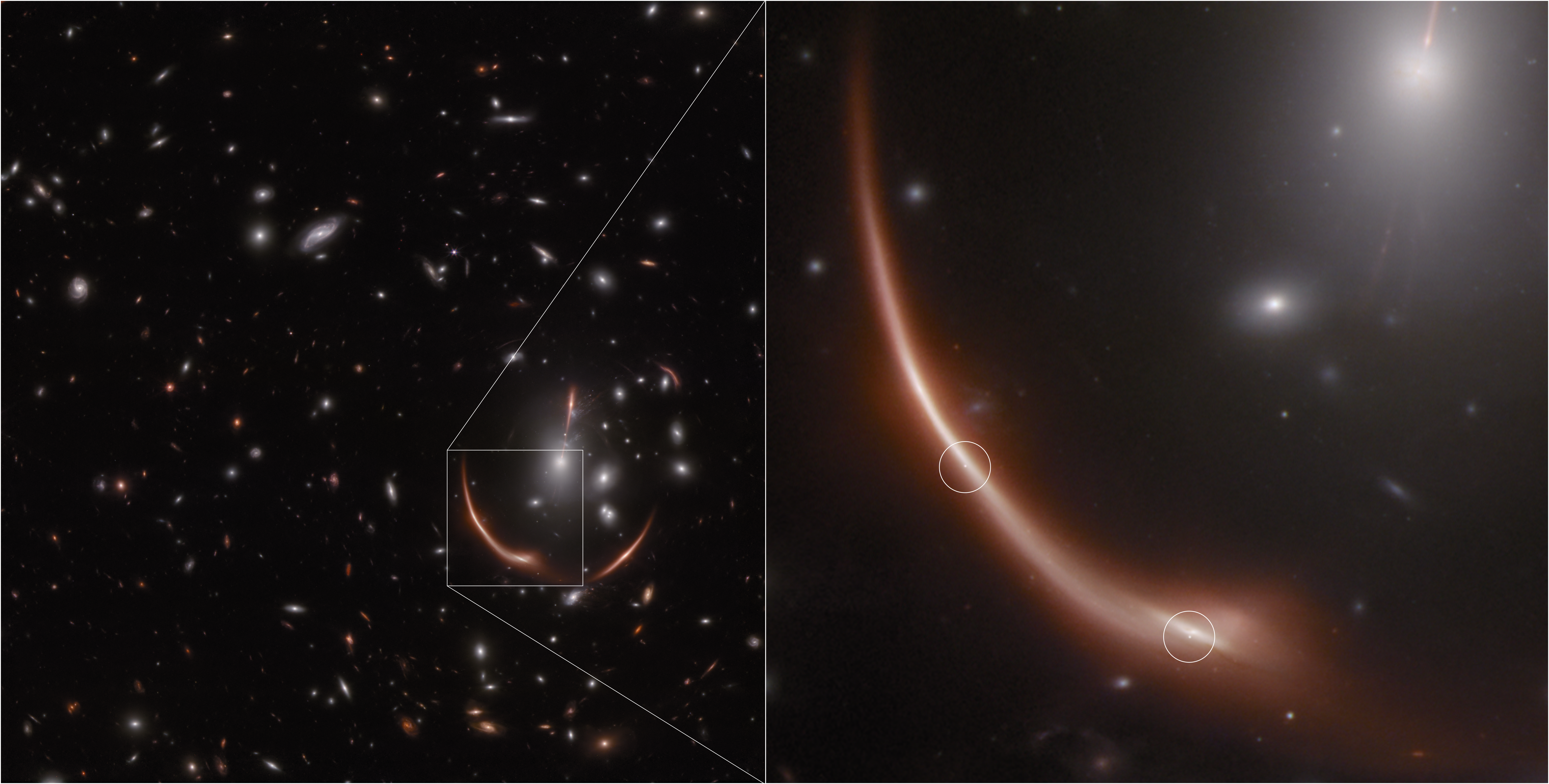
Two images of this supernova in the galaxy MRG-M0138, circled in white, are visible due to gravitational lensing. A third image is expected to appear in 2035.

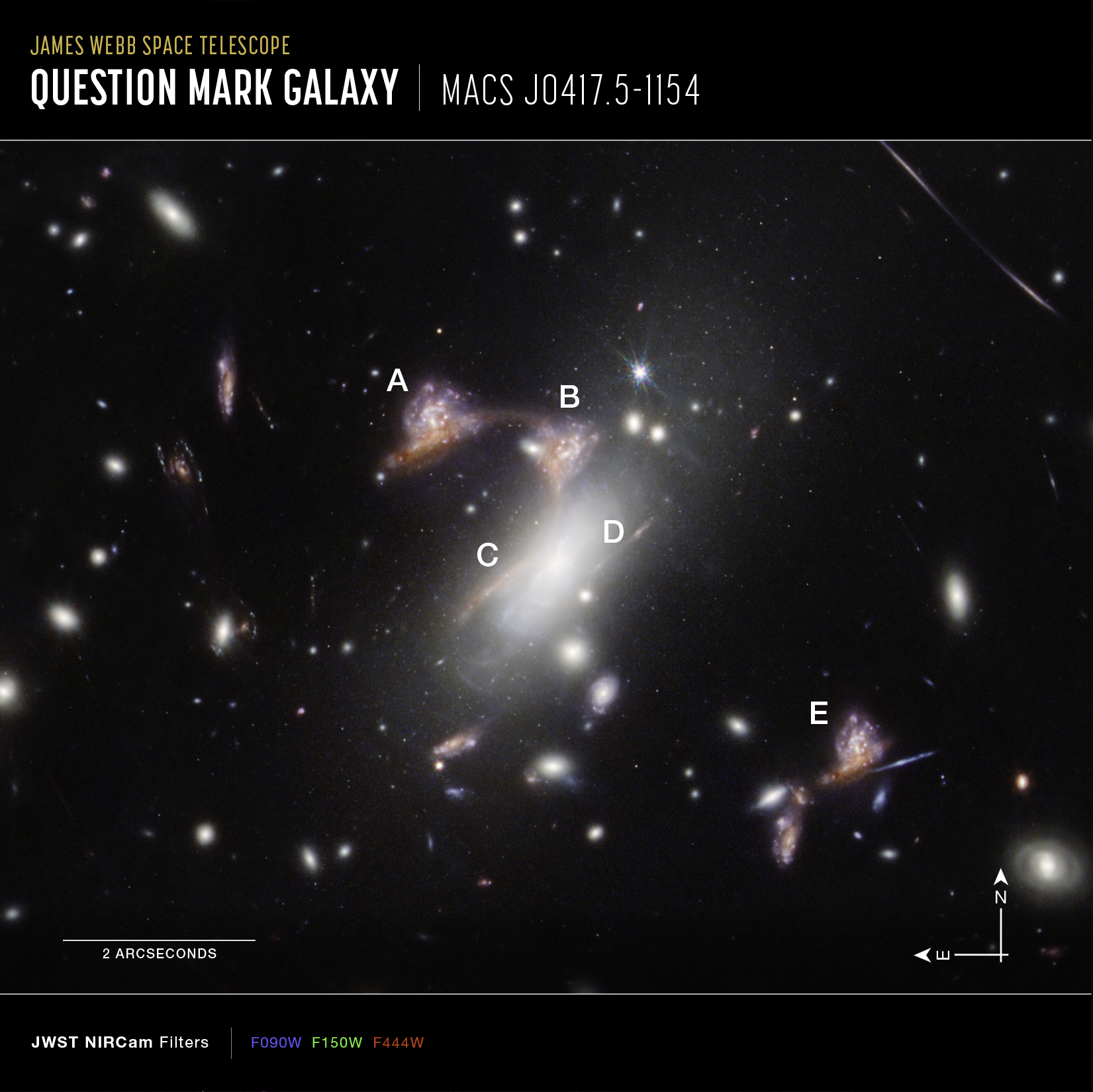
The Question Mark "Galaxy" actually includes five images of the same galaxy pair due to gravitational lensing. The lensed images are labelled A through E.

== See also ==
- Terrestrial atmospheric lens – Concept of using Earth's atmosphere as a large lens
- Galactic lens – Structure of galaxies
- Gravitational lensing formalism – Concept in physics
- Strong gravitational lensing – Gravitational deflection of light
  - Einstein cross – Gravitationally lensed image of a quasar
  - Einstein ring – Feature seen when light is gravitationally lensed by an object
- Weak gravitational lensing – Gravitational deflection of light
- Gravitational microlensing – Astronomical phenomenon due to the gravitational lens effect
- SN Refsdal – Supernova that has been lensed
- Euclid (spacecraft) – European visible and near-infrared space observatory, launched in 2023
