= Galactic lens =

Structure of galaxies

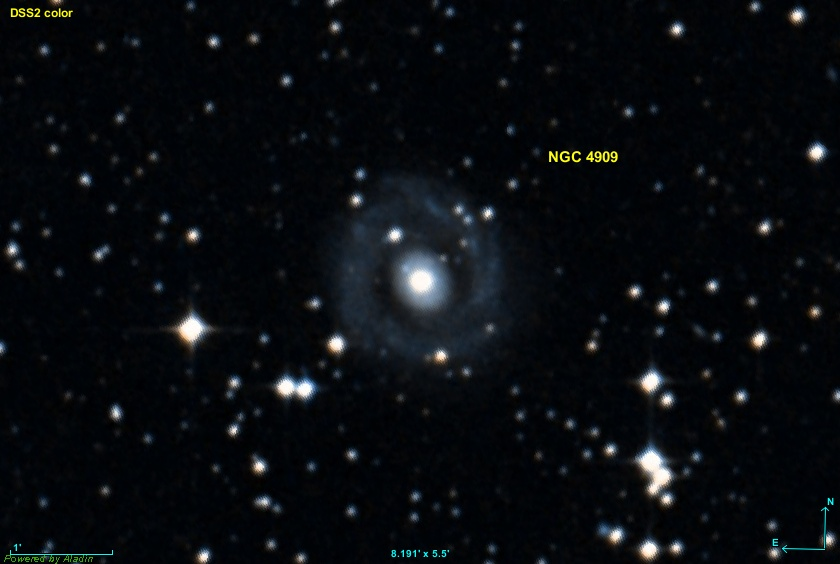
NGC 4909 - a galaxy with an inner lens.

A Galactic lens is a component of a galaxy. It presents an almost uniform distribution of surface brightness.

== Shape ==
This aspect can be noticeable in the region between the bulge and the disk. The bulge is a tightly packed group of stars within a larger formation, and a disk is a component of disk galaxies consisting of gas and stars. Most likely, these structures arise from the "blurring" of the bars.

The lens in the structure of galaxies is an elliptical-shaped component with a nearly uniform distribution of surface brightness and sharp boundaries, whose contribution can be seen in the region between the bulge and the disk, and sometimes in other regions as well.

The lenses are triaxial ellipsoids: in the direction perpendicular to the galactic plane, they are flattened, but not as much as disks, and in the projection on the disk plane, the ratio of major and minor axes is on average 0.9.

Lenses are closely connected with bars and are often found in galaxies with bars - in 54% of SB0-SBa galaxies and in 76% of SBab-SBc galaxies. In those cases when a galaxy contains both a bar and a lens, their sizes most often coincide.

== Formation ==
Lenses most likely arise from bars, although some types of lens cannot be explained by this. Two mechanisms are known that can lead to lens formation. Over time the bar may become more axisymmetric. Not necessarily immediately is all the bar's matter redistributed in this way, as observed galaxies often have both a bar and a lens. The second is that lenses, like bars, arise in the presence of bar-forming instability.

Lenses have been known since at least 1959, first discovered by Gérard de Vaucouleurs, in which he proposed a scheme for classifying galaxies.
