= Climate Science Legal Defense Fund =

US Climate Change organization

- Abbreviation: CSLDF
- Formation: 2011
- Founder: Scott Mandia, Joshua Wolfe
- Type: Not for profit organization
- Purpose: Legal aid
- Location: New York City
- Executive Director: Lauren Kurtz
- Website: https://csldf.org

The Climate Science Legal Defense Fund (CSLDF) is a not-for-profit organization established in 2011 to provide legal assistance to researchers and institutions engaged in climate science facing legal challenges from private entities such as think tanks and legal foundations.

CSLDF also provides litigation support and files amicus briefs in related cases, promotes awareness among scientists of their legal rights and responsibilities, and makes public the legal actions taken against scientists.

CSLDF claims that many legal challenges faced by scientists are intended to silence them for political reasons or stifle their research. According to CSLDF, litigation has intensified against climate scientists in recent years, and salaries earned by academics and researchers are often inadequate to pay for litigation defending against "corporate-funded law firms and institutes."

Following the 2016 U.S. presidential election, CSLDF reported an increase in the need for their services from scientists concerned that they could be targeted by the Trump administration.

== History ==
CSLDF was co-founded by Joshua Wolfe and Scott Mandia, a physical sciences professor at Suffolk County Community College, to help defray the legal costs of a lawsuit against the University of Virginia and Dr. Michael Mann.

The organization hired its first executive director, attorney Lauren Kurtz, in 2014 and received 501(c)3 status in 2015.

The organization reported a spike in cases during the Trump Administration's government-wide effort to stop work on climate change, representing over 300 requests for assistance.

== Work ==
=== Litigation ===
In 2011, CSLDF provided support and funding to Michael Mann when the American Tradition Institute (ATI) served a Freedom of Information Act (FOIA) request on the University of Virginia regarding Mann's climate research. UVA and Mann engaged in litigation with ATI to prove that Virginia law protected Mann's emails and other documents. CSLDF raised more than $100,000 for Mann's litigation. The Virginia Supreme Court ruled in Dr. Mann's favor in spring 2014.

=== Amicus briefs ===
In addition to direct involvement in select litigations, CSLDF provides litigation support and files amicus briefs in related cases. In October 2015, CSLDF filed an amicus brief urging the Arizona Court of Appeals to protect climate scientists' files from open records requests made by the Energy & Environment Legal Institute (E&E Legal). In March 2016, CSLDF filed an amicus brief before the Pima County Superior Court in Arizona, also arguing for protection of climate scientists' private files against open records requests by E&E Legal.

In February 2017, CSLDF filed an amicus brief in a FOIA litigation, urging the District of Columbia court to protect roughly 8,000 emails written and received by federal climate scientists.

In July 2017, CSLDF filed an amicus brief asking the Arizona Court of Appeals to protect scientists from intrusive open record requests.

=== Legal education ===
CSLDF educates scientists about their legal rights and responsibilities and increases awareness of how FOIA and state open record law equivalents are used to harass and intimidate climate scientists.

In early 2017, CSLDF began building a national legal network to help scientists at public and private universities in the United States.

== Publications ==
After the November 20116 election of Donald Trump as U.S. president, CSLDF published Handling Political Harassment and Legal Intimidation: A Pocket Guide for Scientists, which contains basic legal advice for scientists.

In 2017, CSLDF partnered with the American Civil Liberties Union (ACLU) on a pamphlet, "March for Science: Know Your Rights," for those participating in the April 22, 2017 March for Science.
