= František Link =

Czech astronomer (1906–1984)

- Born: 15 August 1906; Brno, Moravia, Austria-Hungary
- Died: 23 September 1984 (aged 78); Paris, France
- Known for: Gravitational lens
- Scientific career
- Fields: Astrophysics, mathematics, geodesy

František Link (15 August 1906 – 23 September 1984) was a Czech astronomer most known for being credited for some of the earliest discussions and research on gravitational lensing, along with publishing the first detailed lensing calculations and observations.

== Education ==
In 1924, Link attended the Masaryk University in Brno to study mathematics, geodesy, and astronomy. He graduated in 1929 with a Master of Science degree. Two years later, Link earned an RNDr. degree.

From 1931 to 1933, Link did his postdoctoral studies at the Observatoires de Lyon and Pic du Midi.
