= Climate Science Rapid Response Team =

Climatological research organization

The Climate Science Rapid Response Team is a service to provide accurate information on climate science in response to media and government queries, by matching members of the media and government with questions, to the working climate scientists best able to answer. "Nearly all of [the participating climate scientists] are members of University faculties in departments involving some aspect of climate science or in government laboratories (e.g. NASA, NOAA), both in the US and abroad."

The "matchmakers" - John Abraham, Scott Mandia and Ray Weymann - formed the group in November 2010.

== Organizations making inquiries ==
By December 2010, the group reported having fielded inquiries from organizations that included The Guardian, The New York Times, the Los Angeles Times, CNN, National Public Radio, and the Associated Press.

== CSRRT recommended resources ==
Although the group only does scientist "matchmaking" for the press or government, it does recommend two resources for public inquiries, Central Coast Climate Science Education and Skeptical Science. It also provides a page of other recommended sources.

== Other Q&A efforts from mainstream climate scientists ==
During the United Nations climate talks in December 2009 and 2010, the American Geophysical Union (AGU) offered a Climate Q&A Service for journalists and conference attendees, drawing in 2010 from a pool of over 700 AGU members - and strictly limiting the questions to matters of science, not policy or evaluating risk.

RealClimate is a blog offering similar service.
