= SPT0615-JD =

Galaxy

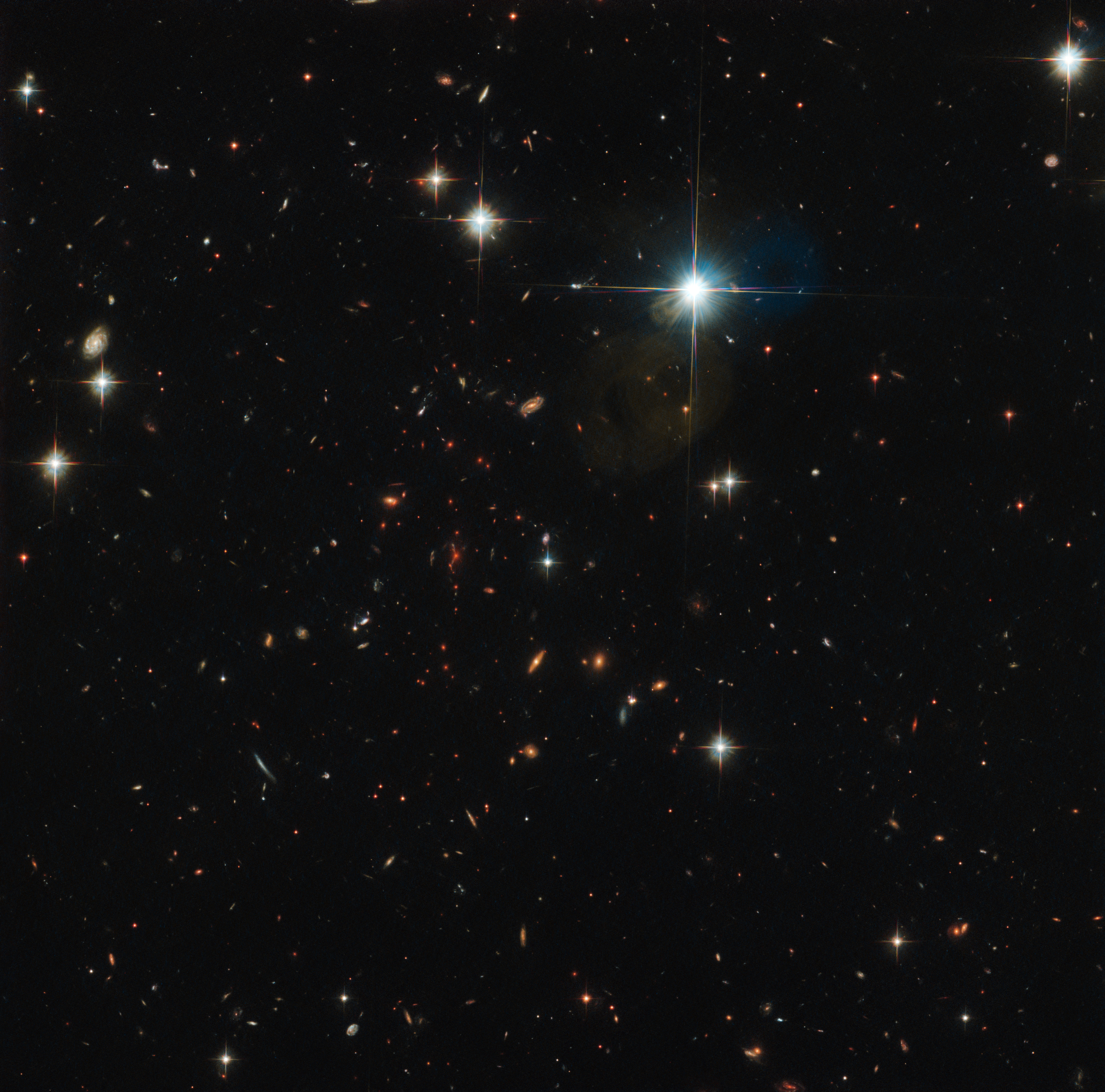
- SPT0615-JD (closer detailed image) using the NASA/ESA Hubble Space Telescope (the galaxy is located towards the upper left, to the right of the group of two stars and one galaxy)

Observation data (J2000 epoch)
- Constellation: Pictor
- Right ascension: 06^{h} 15^{m} 55.03^{s}
- Declination: −57° 46′ 19.56″
- Redshift: 9.9
- Distance: 13.27 billion light-years (light travel time); 31.4 billion light-years (comoving distance)

Characteristics
- Mass: ~3 ×10^{9} M_{☉}
- Size: < 2,500 ly
- Apparent size (V): 0.00065 x 0.00065

Other designations
- RELICS SPT-CL J0615-5746 336, SCB2018 SPTJ0615-JD1

SPT0615-JD is a dwarf galaxy situated within the constellation Pictor, and is the farthest galaxy ever imaged by means of gravitational lensing, as of 2018. Brett Salmon of the Space Telescope Science Institute in Baltimore was the lead scientist of the study of the galaxy.

The galaxy was identified in the Hubble Space Telescope Reionization Lensing Cluster Survey (RELICS) and companion S-RELICS Spitzer program and is at the limits of Hubble's detection capabilities. As a consequence of the effect of a gravitational field of a galaxy cluster of an extremely large size, SPT-CL J0615-5746, (abbreviated to SPT0615), situated at a distance closer to Earth, light from SPT0615-JD located at a further distance, is amplified and distorted (lensed – Einstein 1936; Khvolson 1924; Link 1936) on its motion to the Hubble telescope. This distortion causes the light from the galaxy to arrive as an image lengthened to an arc of about 2 arcseconds long.

"JD" is short for "J-band Dropout" (the galaxy is not detected in the so-called J-band (F125W) The observed image is of 13.3 billion years ago, indicating the galaxy existed when the universe was about only 500 million years in existence. The galaxy is less than 2,500 light-years across.

== Additional reading ==
- Tilman Sauer (2008). "Nova Geminorum 1912 and the Origin of the Idea of Gravitational Lensing". Archive for History of Exact Sciences. 62 (1): 1–22. arXiv:0704.0963. Bibcode:2008AHES...62....1S. doi:10.1007/s00407-007-0008-4. S2CID 17384823.
- Turner, Christina (February 14, 2006). "The Early History of Gravitational Lensing" (PDF). Archived from the original (PDF) on July 25, 2008.
- Bičák, Jiří; Ledvinka, Tomáš (2014). General Relativity, Cosmology and Astrophysics: Perspectives 100 years after Einstein's stay in Prague (illustrated ed.). Springer. pp. 49–50. ISBN 9783319063492.
