= Grand Canyon: A Different View =

2003 book edited by Tom Vail

- Author: Tom Vail
- Publisher: Master Books
- Publication date: June 2003
- Pages: 96
- ISBN: 978-0-89051-373-6
- OCLC: 53820444
- Dewey Decimal: 231.7/652 22
- LC Class: BS658 .V33 2003

Grand Canyon: A Different View is a 2003 book edited by Tom Vail. The book features a series of photographs of the Grand Canyon illustrating 20 essays by creationists Steve Austin, John Baumgardner, Duane Gish, Ken Ham, Russell Humphreys, Henry Morris, John D. Morris, Andrew A. Snelling, Larry Vardiman, John Whitcomb, and Kurt Wise. It presents the Young Earth creationist perspective that the canyon is no more than a few thousand years old and was formed by the Global Flood or Noachian flood of the Bible.

== Controversy ==
The book was approved for sale in Grand Canyon National Park bookstores in 2003, and online. Vail, a river guide in the park, had recently converted to Christianity and adopted "'a different view' of the Canyon, which, according to a biblical time scale, cannot possibly be more than about a few thousand years old. Vail continues to conduct tours of the canyon for creationists through an organization called Canyon Ministries.

Wilfred Elders said that "The book is remarkable because it has 23 co-authors who comprise a veritable 'Who's Who' in creationism. Each chapter of Grand Canyon: A Different View begins with an overview by Vail, followed by brief comments by several contributors that 'have been peer-reviewed to ensure a consistent and Biblical perspective.' This perspective is strict Biblical literalism." He says that it is not a geological book but rather a new, slick proselytizing strategy, beautifully illustrated and multi-authored about a spectacular and world-famous geological feature.

On January 25, 2004, David Shaver, chief of the Geologic Resources Division of the National Park Service (NPS), sent a memorandum to Chuck Fagan at the Office of Policy stating, in part that the book "makes claims that are counter to widely accepted geologic evidence and scientific understanding about the formation and age of the Grand Canyon. In fact, it assaults modern science and well-documented geologic evidence of the canyon's history." Later in 2004, the Grand Canyon National Park bookstore moved the book from the natural science section to the inspirational section as requested by the scientific organizations.

In a letter to Joseph Alston, then superintendent of Grand Canyon National Park, the presidents of seven geoscience societies voiced their concerns: "The Grand Canyon provides a remarkable and unique opportunity to educate the public about earth science. In fairness to the millions of park visitors, we must clearly distinguish religious tenets from scientific knowledge."

In response to the 2003 controversy, the NPS told reporters and members of Congress in February 2004 that it was conducting a review of the book and would soon make a decision on it. In December 2006 the NPS responded to a Freedom of Information Act request submitted by Public Employees for Environmental Responsibility (PEER) which revealed that no formal review had ever taken place. PEER says that this was the only book approved for addition to the park bookstore in 2003; 22 books and other products were rejected.

== See also ==
- Geology of the Grand Canyon area
- Public Employees for Environmental Responsibility
