= NGC 4909 =

Ring galaxy in the constellation Centaurus

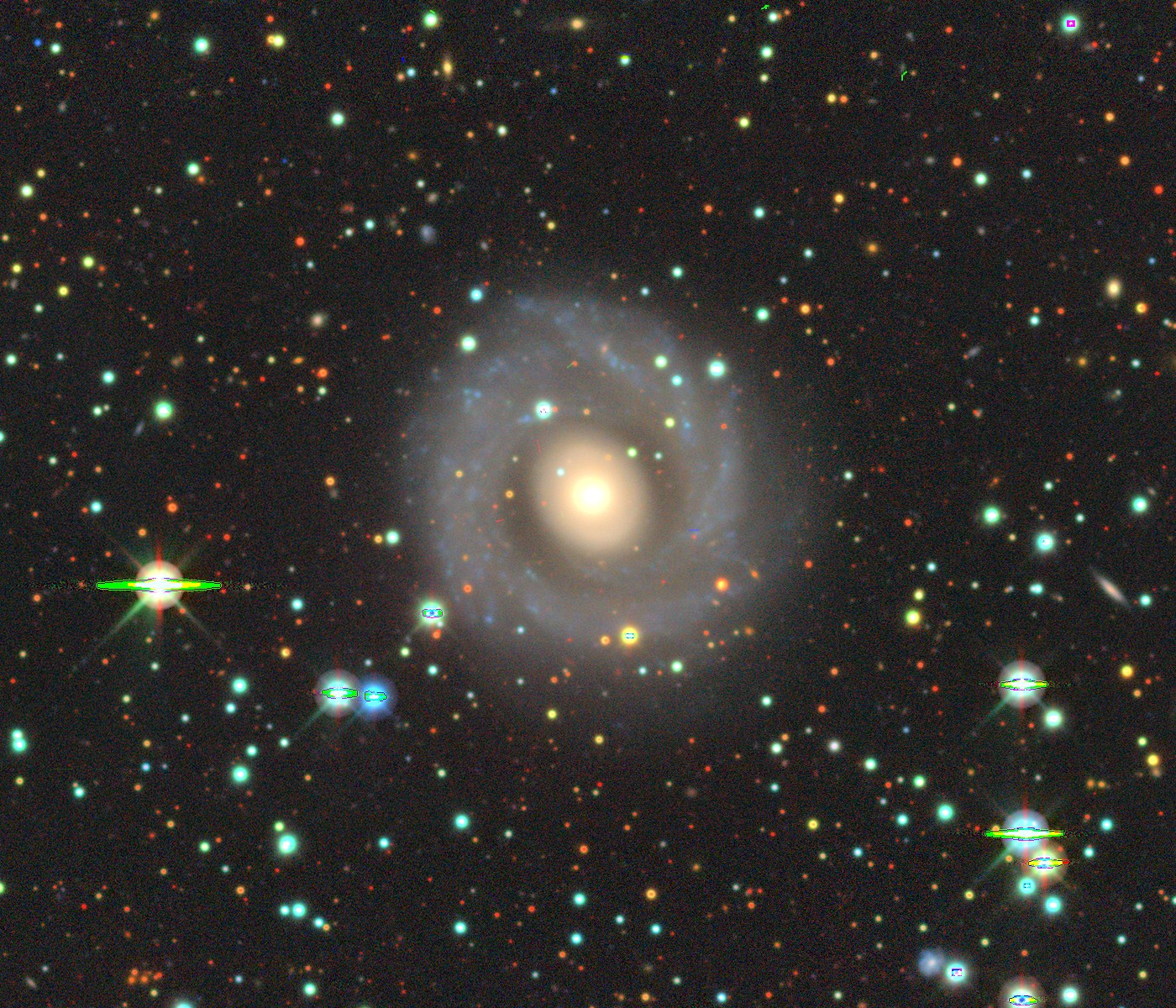
- NGC 4909 imaged by Legacy Surveys

Observation data
- Constellation: Centaurus
- Right ascension: 13h 03m 28s
- Declination: -42° 54’ 25”
- Redshift: 0.011285
- Apparent magnitude (V): 12.7
- Apparent magnitude (B): 13.63
- Surface brightness: 23.7
- magnitude (J): 11.14
- magnitude (H): 10.43
- magnitude (K): 10.13

Characteristics
- Type: Spiral galaxy (SAa)

NGC 4909 is an early spiral ring galaxy located 155 million light years from Earth in the constellation of Centaurus. The galaxy has a small, elongated and bright nucleus.
