= IRC 0218 =

Galaxy cluster in the constellation Cetus

IRC-0218A
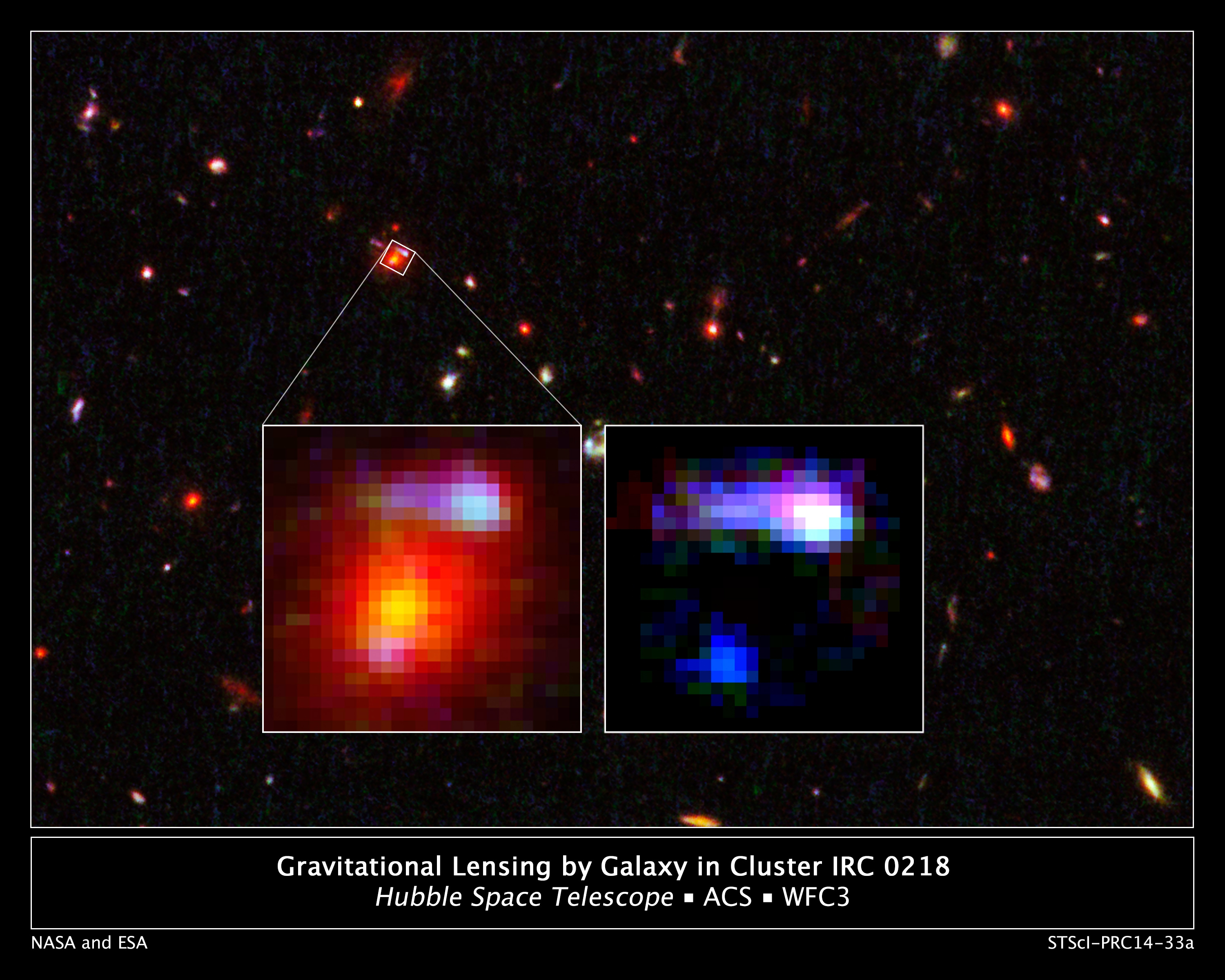
- Gravitational Lensing by Galaxy in Cluster IRC 0218.

Observation data (Epoch J2000)
- Constellation: Cetus
- Right ascension: 02^{h} 18^{m} 21.3^{s}
- Declination: −05° 10′ 27″
- Redshift: 1.62

Other designations
- XMM-LSS J02182-05102

The galaxy cluster IRC 0218 (also known as XMM-LSS J02182−05102) hosts the most distant strong gravitational lensing galaxy currently known at a redshift of z = 1.62. The lens is one of the two brightest cluster galaxies and is lensing a background star-forming galaxy at a redshift of z = 2.26 into a bright arc and a faint counterimage. The lens was discovered through a combination of Hubble Space Telescope and Keck telescope imaging and spectroscopy. The discovery and subsequent analysis of the lens was published in the Astrophysical Journal Letters on June 23, 2014 by an international team of astronomers led by Dr. Kim-Vy Tran from Texas A&M University in College Station, Texas and team members Dr. Kenneth Wong and Dr. Sherry Suyu from the Academia Sinica Institute of Astronomy and Astrophysics in Taipei, Taiwan.

The celestial coordinates of the gravitationally lensed galaxy cluster are 02 hours, 18 minutes and 21.5 seconds and -05 degrees, 10 minutes and 19.9 seconds.
