= Ray Weymann =

American astronomer and astrophysicist

- Education: California Institute of Technology, Princeton University
- Scientific career
- Thesis: Heating of stellar chromospheres by shock waves and coronal evaporation as a possible mechanism for mass loss in red giants. (1960)

Ray Weymann is a retired astronomer and astrophysicist, associated with the Carnegie Institution of Washington. His PhD is from Princeton University. He is a founder of the Climate Science Rapid Response Team, a member National Academy of Sciences (1984), and past president of the Astronomical Society of the Pacific 1973-1975.

He has made notable contributions to astronomy in the areas of the evolution of high redshift galaxies, and mass ejection from active galaxies. He was part of the team that first observed a gravitationally lensed quasar in 1979.
