= Scott Mandia =

Scott A. Mandia is professor of Earth and space sciences and assistant chair of the Physical Sciences Department at Suffolk County Community College, Long Island, New York, US. He has been teaching introductory meteorology and climatology courses for 28 years. In 1997, he won the State University of New York Chancellor's Award for Excellence in Teaching.

== Education ==
Mandia received his M.S. – Meteorology from the Pennsylvania State University in 1990 and his B.S. – Meteorology from University of Lowell in 1987.

== Career ==
=== Climate science communication ===
==== Weblog ====
Mandia is very active in advocacy against climate change denial. To this end, he maintains a website titled "Global Warming: Man or Myth?", included at the "Start Here" tab of RealClimate.org. Mandia also writes about climate change and politics at his blog.

==== Climate Science Rapid Response Team matchmaker service ====
Mandia is a co-founder and matchmaker of the Climate Science Rapid Response Team, matching media and government individuals who have climate questions, to working climate scientists with the expertise to answer them.

=== Meteorology ===
In addition to climate change, Mandia has written on the subject of Long Island hurricanes. especially the New England Hurricane of 1938, known locally as the "Long Island Express" and prognostication on the future vulnerability of Long Island to hurricanes.

=== Learning modules for college students ===
Mandia has also published a series of weather and climate learning modules titled Investigations in Atmospheric Sciences that are geared toward non-science major college students.
