= Maureen O'Hara =

Irish and American actress and singer (1920–2015)

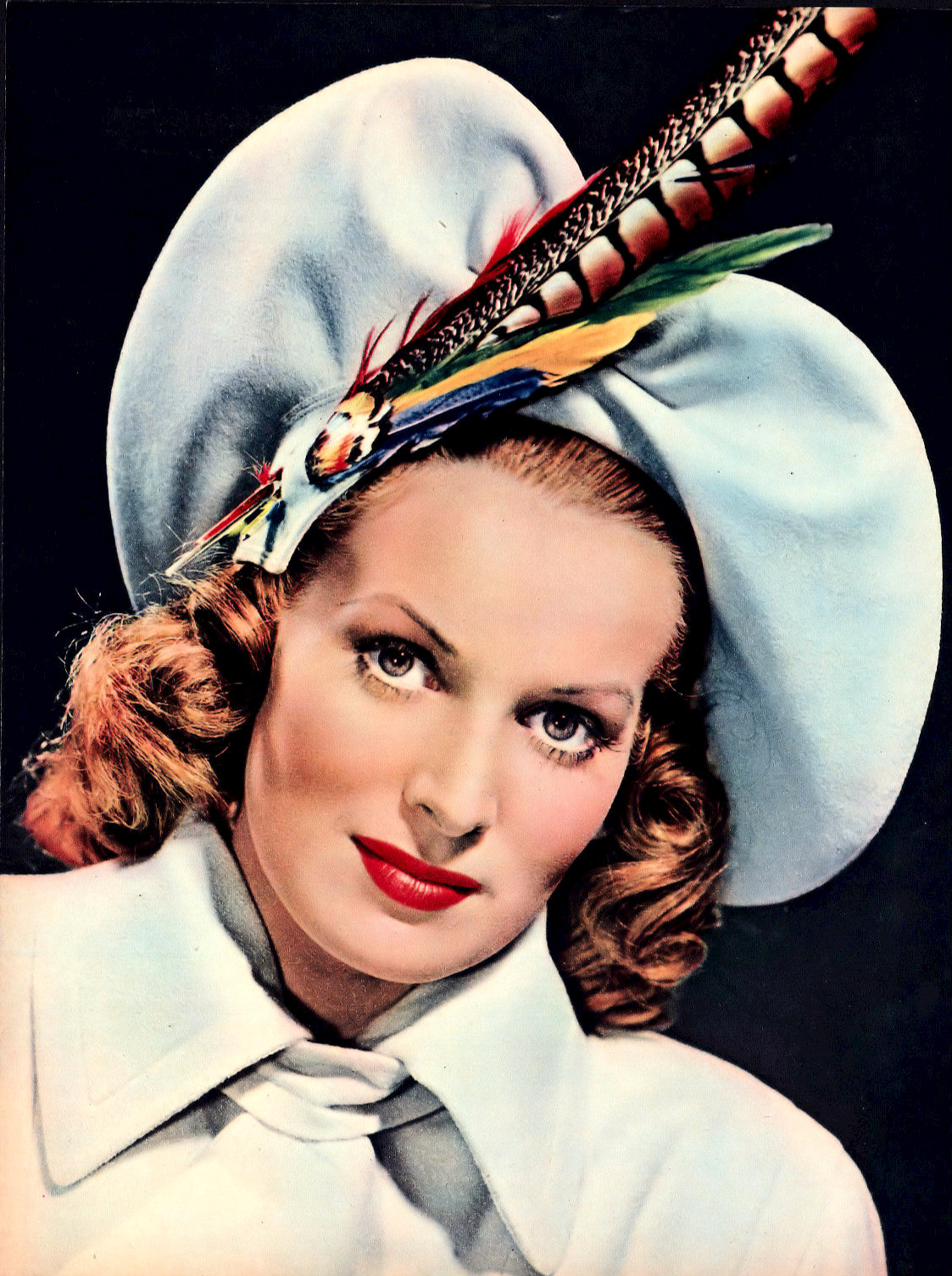
- O'Hara in 1947
- Born: Maureen FitzSimons; 17 August 1920; Dublin, Ireland
- Died: 24 October 2015 (aged 95); Boise, Idaho, US
- Resting place: Arlington National Cemetery
- Citizenship: Ireland; US (from 1946)
- Education: Guildhall School of Music
- Occupations: Actress; singer
- Years active: 1938–1973; 1991–2000
- Works: Filmography
- Spouses: George H. Brown (m. 1939; annul. 1941) William Houston Price (m. 1941; div. 1953) Charles F. Blair Jr. (m. 1968; died 1978)
- Children: 1

Maureen O'Hara (née FitzSimons; 17 August 1920 – 24 October 2015) was an Irish and American actress and singer who became successful in Hollywood from the 1940s through to the 1960s. She was a natural redhead who was known for playing passionate but sensible heroines, often in Westerns and adventure films. She worked with director John Ford and long-time friend John Wayne on numerous projects.

O'Hara was born into a Catholic family and raised in Dublin, Ireland. She aspired to become an actress from a very young age. She trained with the Rathmines Theatre Company from the age of 10 and at the Abbey Theatre from the age of 14. She was given a screen test, which was deemed unsatisfactory, but Charles Laughton saw potential in her and arranged for her to co-star with him in Alfred Hitchcock's Jamaica Inn in 1939. Laughton insisted that she change her surname from FitzSimons against her wishes, and she became "O'Hara". She moved to Hollywood the same year to appear with him in the production of The Hunchback of Notre Dame, and was given a contract by RKO Pictures. From there, she went on to enjoy a long and highly successful career, and acquired the nickname "the Queen of Technicolor".

She appeared in films such as How Green Was My Valley (1941) (her first collaboration with John Ford), The Black Swan with Tyrone Power (1942), The Spanish Main (1945), Sinbad the Sailor (1947), the Christmas classic Miracle on 34th Street (1947) with John Payne and Natalie Wood, and Comanche Territory (1950). O'Hara made her first film with John Wayne, the actor with whom she is most closely associated, in Rio Grande (1950); this was followed by The Quiet Man (1952), The Wings of Eagles (1957), McLintock! (1963) and Big Jake (1971). Such was her strong chemistry with Wayne that many assumed they were married or in a relationship. In the 1960s, O'Hara increasingly turned to more motherly roles as she aged, appearing in films such as The Deadly Companions (1961), The Parent Trap (1961) and The Rare Breed (1966). She retired from the industry in 1971, but returned 20 years later to appear with John Candy in Only the Lonely (1991).

In the late 1970s, O'Hara helped run her third husband Charles F. Blair Jr.'s flying business in Saint Croix in the United States Virgin Islands, and edited a magazine, but later sold them to spend more time in Glengarriff in Ireland. She was married three times, and had one daughter, Bronwyn, with her second husband. Her autobiography, 'Tis Herself, published in 2004, became a New York Times bestseller. In 2009, The Guardian named her one of the best actors never to have received an Academy Award nomination. In November 2014, she was presented with an Honorary Academy Award with the inscription "To Maureen O'Hara, one of Hollywood's brightest stars, whose inspiring performances glowed with passion, warmth and strength". In 2020, she was ranked number one on The Irish Times list of Ireland's greatest film actors.

== Early life and education ==
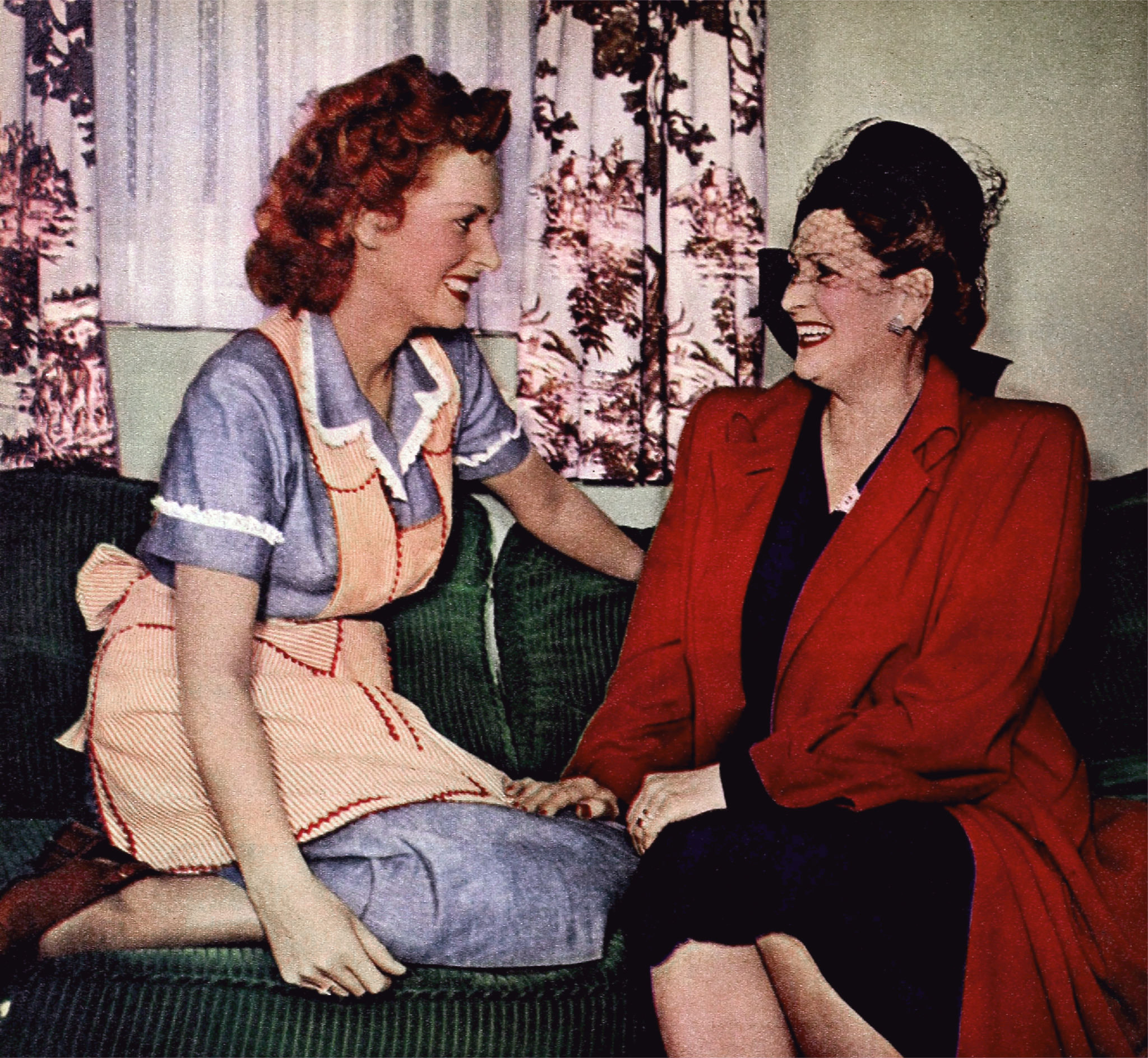
O'Hara with her mother, Marguerite FitzSimons, in 1948

O'Hara was born Maureen FitzSimons on 17 August 1920 at Beechwood Avenue in the Dublin suburb of Ranelagh. She stated that she was "born into the most remarkable and eccentric family I could have possibly hoped for". She was the second eldest of six children of Charles and Marguerite (née Lilburn) FitzSimons, and the only red-headed child in the family. Her father was in the clothing business and bought into Shamrock Rovers Football Club, a team O'Hara supported from childhood.

O'Hara inherited her singing voice from her mother, a former operatic contralto and successful women's clothier, who in her younger years was widely considered to have been one of Ireland's most beautiful women. She noted that whenever her mother left the house, men would leave their houses just so they could catch a glimpse of her in the street. O'Hara's siblings were Peggy, the eldest, and younger Charles, Florrie, Margot and Jimmy. Peggy dedicated her life to a religious order, becoming a Sister of Charity.

"I was a blunt child—blunt almost to the point of rudeness. I told the truth and shamed all the devils. I didn't take discipline very well. I would never be slapped in school. If a teacher had slapped me I would have bitten her. I guess I was a bold, bad child, but it was exciting. When I went to the Dominican College later on I did not have beaux as the other girls did. There was one lad who followed me around for two years. He told me at last that he never once dared to speak to me because I looked as though I would bite his head off if I did".

— O'Hara on her childhood personality

O'Hara earned the nickname "Baby Elephant" for being a pudgy infant. A tomboy, she enjoyed fishing in the River Dodder, riding horses, swimming and soccer, and would play boys' games and climb trees.

O'Hara was so keen on soccer that at one point, she pressed her father to found a women's team, and professed that Glenmalure Park, then home ground of Shamrock Rovers F.C., became "like a second home". She enjoyed fighting, and trained in judo as a teenager. She later admitted that she was jealous of boys in her youth and the freedom they had, and that they could steal apples from orchards and not get into trouble.

O'Hara first attended the John Street West Girls' School near Thomas Street in Dublin's Liberties Area. She began dancing at the age of 5, when a fortune teller predicted that she would become rich and famous, and she would boast to friends as they sat in her back garden that she would "become the most famous actress in the world". Her enthusiastic family fully supported the idea. When she recited a poem on stage in school at the age of six, O'Hara immediately felt an attraction to performing in front of an audience. From that age she trained in drama, music and dance along with her siblings at the Ena Mary Burke School of Drama and Elocution in Dublin. Their affinity with the arts prompted O'Hara to refer to the family as the "Irish von Trapp family".

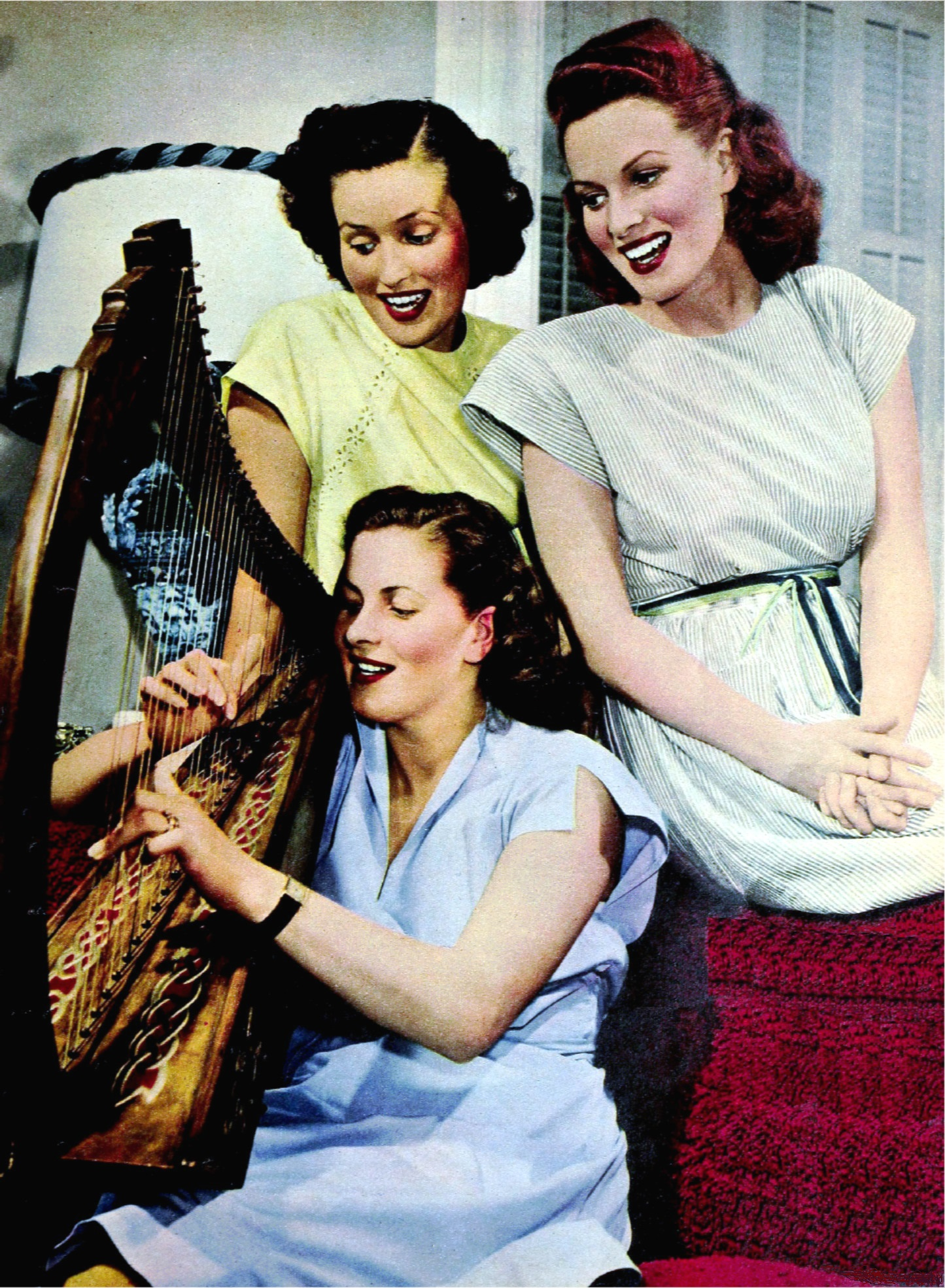
O'Hara (right) with sisters Margot and Florrie in 1947

At the age of 10, O'Hara joined the Rathmines Theatre Company and began working in amateur theatre in the evenings after her lessons. One of her earliest roles was Robin Hood in a Christmas pantomime. O'Hara's dream at this time was to be a stage actress. By the age of 12, O'Hara had reached the height of 5 feet 6 inches (1.68 m), and it worried her mother for a while that she would become "the tallest girl" in Ireland as Maureen's father was 6 feet 4 inches (1.93 m). She expressed relief when O'Hara only grew another two inches.

At the age of 14, O'Hara joined the Abbey Theatre. Though she was mentored by playwright Lennox Robinson, she found her time at the theatre disappointing. In 1935, at the age of 15, she won the first Dramatic Prize of the national competition of the performing arts, the Dublin Feis Award, for her performance as Portia in The Merchant of Venice. She trained as a shorthand typist, working for Crumlin Laundry before joining Eveready Battery Company, where she worked as a typist and bookkeeper. She later put her skills to use when she typed the script of The Quiet Man for John Ford.

In 1936, she became the youngest pupil to graduate from the Guildhall School of Music at the time, and the following year, she won the Dawn Beauty Competition, winning £50. As she matured into a young woman, O'Hara, like many actresses, became increasingly self-conscious, which affected her for a while. In one performance, which was watched by her father from the back of the theatre, O'Hara "sensed there was someone out front watching me, perhaps critically. My arms felt like lead. I gave a rotten show that night. I grew up with the terrible feeling that I was being laughed at".

== Film career ==
=== 1937–1940: Early career ===
"On the screen was a girl. She looked at least 35, she was over done up ... very made up face, and her hair in an over-grand style, but just for a split perfect second light was on her face and you could see as the girl turned her head around your extraordinarily beautiful profile, which was absolutely invisible among all your makeup. Well Mr. Pommer and I sent for you and you came and blew into the office like a hurricane. You had a tweed suit on with hair sticking out and coming from Ireland. You blew into the office and said [in Irish accent] 'Watchya want with me'. I took you out for lunch and I never forgot when I asked you why you wanted to be an actress. I'll never forget your reply. You said 'When I was a child I used to go down the garden, talk to the flowers and pretend I was the flower talking back to myself.' And you had to be a pretty nice girl and had to be a pretty good actress too. And heavens knows you're both".

— Charles Laughton addressing O'Hara with his fond memories of spotting her at the age of 17

At the age of 17, O'Hara was offered her first major role at the Abbey Theatre but was distracted by the attentions of actor-singer Harry Richman. Richman arranged with the manager of the Gresham Hotel in Dublin to meet her at the hotel while she was dining with her family. He proposed that she go to Elstree Studios for a screen test and become a film actress. O'Hara arrived in London shortly afterwards with her mother. During the screen test, the studio adorned her in a "gold lamé dress with flapping sleeves like wings" and heavy makeup with an ornate hair style, which was deemed to be far from satisfactory. O'Hara detested the audition, during which she had to walk in and pick up a telephone. She recalled thinking to herself, "My God, get me back to the Abbey". Charles Laughton later saw the test and, despite the overdone makeup and costume, was intrigued, paying particular notice to her large and expressive eyes. After seeking the approval of his business partner Erich Pommer, they arranged to meet O'Hara through a talent agency run by Connie Chapman and Vere Barker. Laughton was impressed with O'Hara, particularly by her lack of nerves and refusal to read an extract upon his request unprepared, during which she said: "I am very sorry but absolutely no". She was offered an initial seven-year contract with their new company, Mayflower Pictures. Though her family were shocked at her being given a contract so young, they accepted, and O'Hara traveled across Ireland in celebration before arriving back in London to commence her film career. O'Hara later stated that "I owe my whole career to Mr. Pommer".

O'Hara made her screen debut in Walter Forde's Kicking the Moon Around (1938), although she did not consider it a part of her filmography. Richman had introduced her to Forde at Elstree Studios, but as she was not cast in the film in a notable role, she agreed to deliver one line in it as a favor to Richman for helping with her screen test. Laughton arranged for her to appear in the low-budget musical My Irish Molly (1938), the only film she made under her real name, Maureen FitzSimons. In the film, she plays a woman named Eiléen O'Shea, who rescues an orphan girl named Molly. Biographer Aubrey Malone stated of it: "One could argue that O'Hara never looked as enticing as she does in Little Miss Molly, even if she isn't 'Maureen O'Hara' quite yet. She wears no makeup, and there's no Hollywood glamour, but despite (or because of?) that, she is rapturously beautiful. Her accent is thick, which is perhaps why she didn't mention the film much. It also looks as if it were made in the 1920s rather than the 1930s, so primitive are the sets and characters". Malone added that though the lot was "ham-fisted", it is a "quaint film which O'Hara scholars should view if only to see early evidence of her natural instinct for dramatic timing and scene interpretation".

O'Hara's first major film role was that of Mary Yellen in Jamaica Inn (1939), directed by Alfred Hitchcock and co-starring Laughton. O'Hara portrayed the innkeeper's niece, an orphan who goes to live with her aunt and uncle at a Cornish tavern, a heroine which she describes as "torn between the love of her family and her love for a lawman in disguise". Laughton insisted that she change her name to the shorter "O'Mara" or "O'Hara", and she eventually decided on the latter after expressing contempt at both. When she said "I like Maureen FitzSimons and I want to keep it", Laughton replied with, "Very well, you're Maureen O'Hara." (O'Hara would later say that "nobody would ever get [FitzSimons] straight.") O'Hara noted that Laughton had always wanted a daughter of his own, and treated her as such, and she later stated that Laughton's death in 1962 was like losing a parent. She worked well under Hitchcock, professing to have "never experienced the strange feeling of detachment with Hitchcock that many other actors claimed to have felt while working with him." On the contrary, Laughton was engaged in a bitter battle with Hitchcock throughout the production and resented many of Hitchcock's ideas, including changing the nature of the villain from the novel. Though Jamaica Inn is generally seen by critics and the director himself as one of his weakest films, O'Hara was praised, with one critic stating "the newcomer, Maureen O'Hara is charming to look at and distinct promise as an actress". Seeing the film was an eyeopener for O'Hara and change in self-perception, having always seen herself as a tomboy and realizing that on screen she was a woman of great beauty to others. When she returned to Ireland briefly after the film was completed it dawned on her that life would never be the same again, and she was hurt when she attempted to make pleasant conversation to some local girls and they rejected her advances, considering her to be very arrogant.

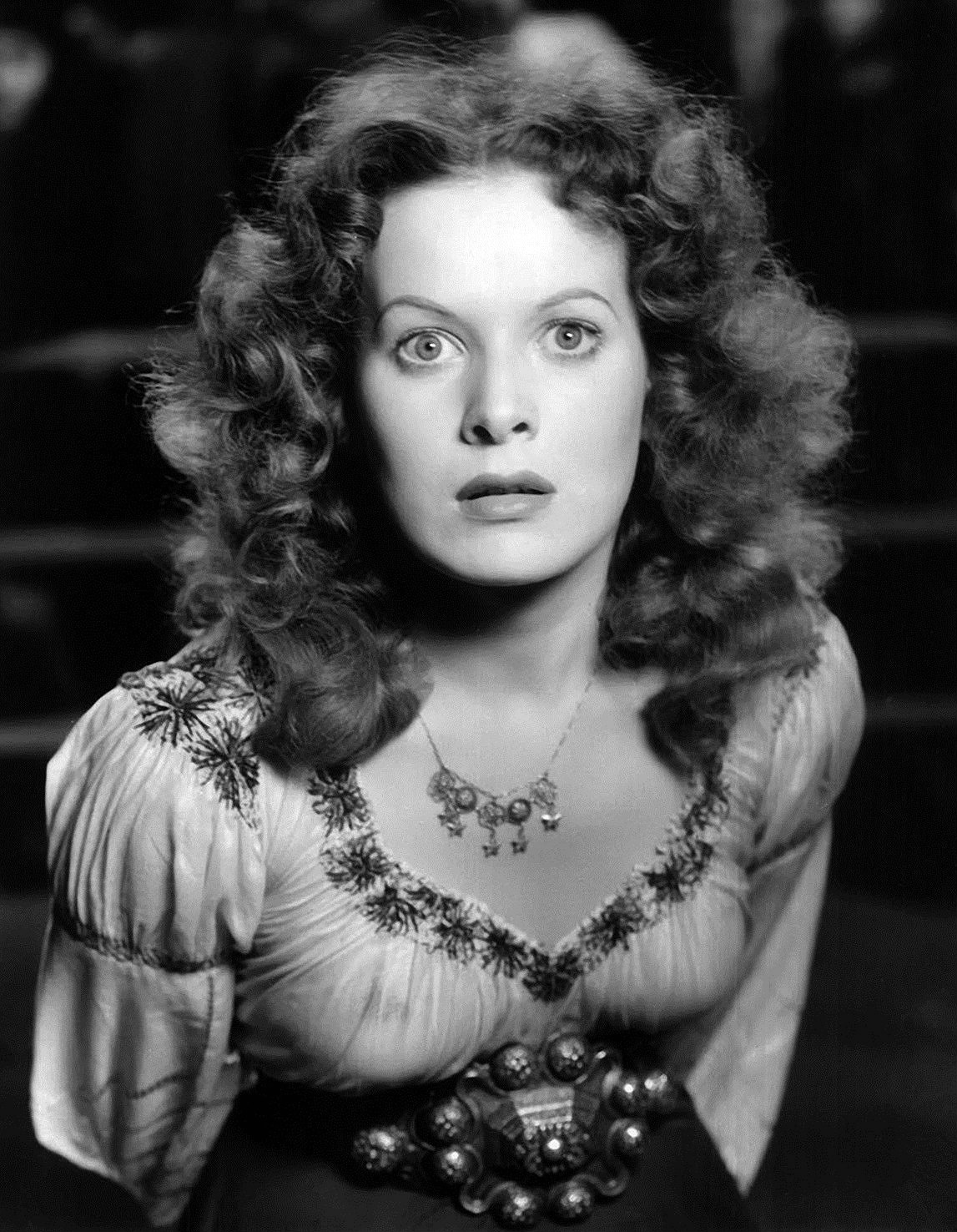
O'Hara in The Hunchback of Notre Dame (1939)

Laughton was so pleased with O'Hara's performance in Jamaica Inn that she was cast opposite him in The Hunchback of Notre Dame (1939) for RKO in Hollywood. She boarded the RMS Queen Mary with him and her mother to New York, and then traveled by train to Hollywood. O'Hara's agent, Lew Wasserman, arranged for a pay increase from $80 a week to $700 a week. As the new face of RKO, she garnered much attention from the Hollywood press and society before the film was even released, something that made her uncomfortable, as she felt that she was being viewed as a "novelty" and "people were making a fuss over me because of something I hadn't yet done, something they just thought I might do". O'Hara portrayed Esmeralda, a gypsy dancer who is imprisoned and later sentenced to death by the Parisian authorities. Director William Dieterle initially showed concern that O'Hara was too tall and disliked her wavy hair, asking for her to step under a shower to straighten it out. Filming commenced in the San Fernando Valley, at a time when it was experiencing its hottest summer in its history. O'Hara described it as a "physically demanding shoot", due to the heavy makeup and costume requirements, and recalls that she gasped at Laughton in makeup as Quasimodo, remarking, "Good God, Charles. Is that really you?" O'Hara insisted on doing her own stunts from the outset, and for the scene in which the hangman places a noose around her neck, no safety nets were used. The film was a commercial success, taking $3 million at the box office. O'Hara was generally praised for her performance though some critics thought that Laughton stole the show. One critic thought that was the strength of the film, writing: "The contrast between Laughton as the pathetic hunchback and O'Hara as the fresh-faced, tenderly solicitous gypsy girl is Hollywood teaming at its most inspired".

After the completion of The Hunchback of Notre Dame, World War II began, and Laughton, realizing his company could no longer film in London, sold O'Hara's contract to RKO. O'Hara later professed that this "broke my heart, I felt completely abandoned in a strange and faraway place". She next featured in John Farrow's A Bill of Divorcement (1940), a remake of George Cukor's 1932 film. O'Hara portrayed Sydney Fairchild, who was played by Katharine Hepburn in the original, in a film which she considered to have had a "screenplay [which] was mediocre at best". The production became difficult for O'Hara after Farrow reportedly made "suggestive comments" to her and began stalking her at home; once he realized that O'Hara was not interested in him sexually, he began bullying her on set. O'Hara punched him in the jaw one day, which put an end to the mistreatment. O'Hara's performance was criticized by reviewers, with the critic from The New York Sun writing that she "lacked the intensity and desperation it must have; nor does she seem to have a sparkle of humor". She next found a role as an aspiring ballerina who performs with a dance troupe in Dance, Girl, Dance (1940). She considered it to have been a physically demanding film, and felt intimidated by Lucille Ball during the production as she had been a former Ziegfeld and Goldwyn girl and was a superior dancer. The two remained friends for many years after the film was completed.

=== 1941–1943: Hollywood breakthrough ===
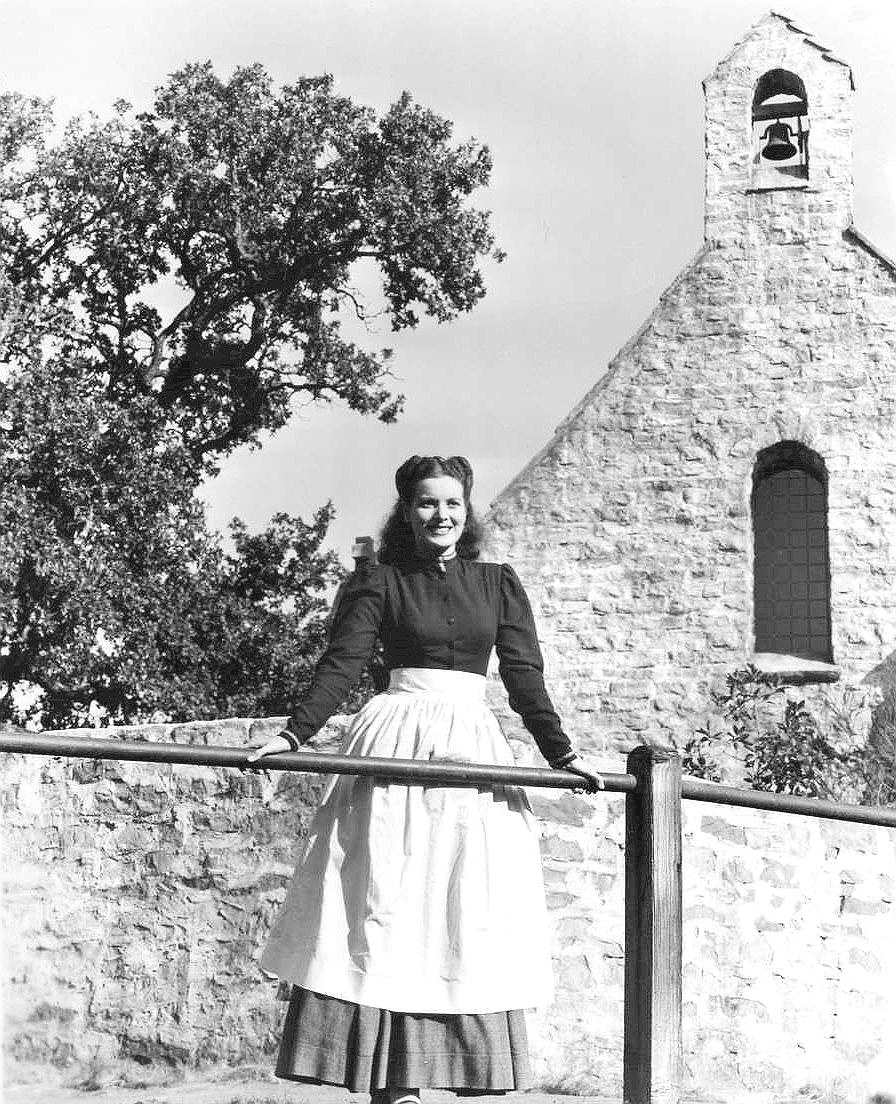
O'Hara in How Green Was My Valley (1941)

O'Hara began 1941 by appearing in They Met in Argentina, RKO's answer to Down Argentine Way (1940). O'Hara later declared that she "knew it was going to be a stinker; terrible script, bad director, preposterous plot, forgettable music". She grew increasingly frustrated with the direction of her career at this time. Ida Zeitlin wrote that O'Hara had "reached a pitch of despair where she was about ready to throw in the towel, to break her contract, to collapse against the stone wall of indifference and howl like a baby wolf". She pleaded with her agent for a role, however small, in John Ford's upcoming film How Green Was My Valley (1941), at 20th Century Fox, a film about a close, hard-working Welsh mining family living in the heart of the South Wales Valleys in the 19th century. The film, which won the Academy Award for Best Picture, began an artistic collaboration with Ford that would span 20 years and five feature films.

Her substantial role as Angharad, which she was given without a full-screen test, beating Katharine Hepburn and Gene Tierney to the part, proved to be her breakthrough role. It was made possible by a change to her contract with RKO, in which Fox bought the rights to feature O'Hara in one film each year. Ford developed a nickname for her, "Rosebud", and the two developed a long but turbulent friendship, with O'Hara often visiting Ford and his wife Mary in social visits and spending time aboard his yacht Araner. Despite this, Ford was an unpredictable character with a mean streak, and in one instance he punched O'Hara in the jaw for some unknown reason, and she only took it from him because she wanted to show him she could take a punch like a man. The production of How Green Was My Valley was originally intended to be shot in the Rhondda Valley, but due to the war it had to be filmed in the San Fernando Valley, on a $1.25 million set, which took 150 builders six months to complete.

O'Hara recalled that Ford would allow her to improvise extensively during the filming, but was very much the boss, commenting that "nobody dared step out of line, which gave the performers a sense of security". O'Hara became such good friends with Anna Lee during the shooting that she later named her daughter Bronwyn after Lee's character. The film was lauded by the critics, and was nominated for 10 Academy Awards, winning three, including Best Picture. Both O'Hara and co-star Walter Pidgeon, who played the minister, were praised for their performances, with Variety writing that "Maureen O'Hara splendid as the object of his unrequited love, who marries the mine owner's son out of pique".

Film historian Joseph McBride considered O'Hara's performance to have been the most emotionally powerful he'd seen since Katharine Hepburn in Mary of Scotland (1936). O'Hara stated that her favorite scene in the film took place outside the church after her character gets married, remarking, "I make my way down the steps to the carriage waiting below, the wind catches my veil and fans it out in a perfect circle all the way around my face. Then it floats straight up above my head and points to the heavens. It's breathtaking."

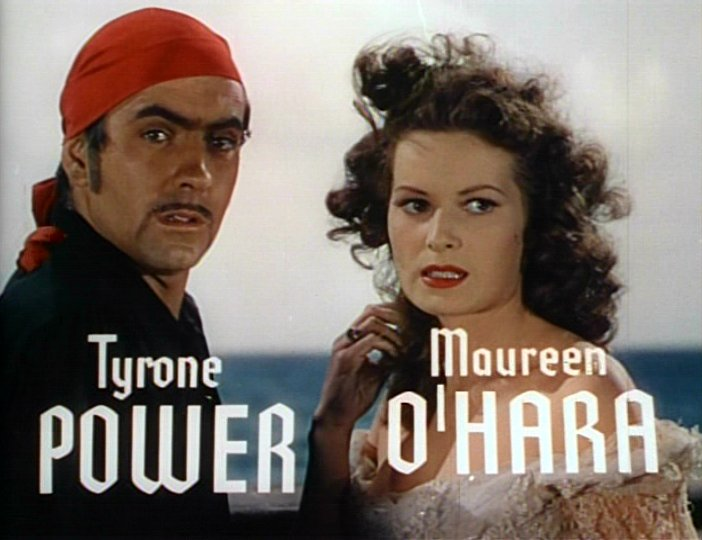
Tyrone Power and O'Hara in the trailer for The Black Swan (1942)

Malone notes that when the United States entered World War II in 1941, many of the better actors became involved in the war effort and O'Hara struggled to find good co-stars. He points out that she increasingly starred in adventure pictures, which allowed her to develop her acting and keep her profile high in Hollywood. O'Hara had next intended appearing opposite Tyrone Power in Son of Fury: The Story of Benjamin Blake, but was hospitalized in early 1942, during which she had her appendix and two ovarian cysts removed at Reno Hospital. Producer Zanuck scoffed at the operation, thinking it was an excuse for a break. He passed it off as "probably a fragment left over from an abortion", which deeply offended her, as a devout Catholic.

O'Hara instead starred in the Technicolor war picture, To the Shores of Tripoli, her first Technicolor picture and first on-screen partnership with John Payne, in which she portrayed Navy nurse Lieutenant Mary Carter. Though the film was a considerable commercial success, becoming a benchmark for "service pictures" of the era, O'Hara later commented that she "couldn't understand why the quality of his (Bruce Humberstone's) pictures never seemed to match their impressive box-office receipts". Malone wrote that "nobody in the film seemed to have lived life. The character's emotions, like their uniforms, seem too streamlined". O'Hara next played an unconventional role as a timid socialite who joins the army as a cook in Henry Hathaway's Ten Gentlemen from West Point (1942), which tells the fictional story of the first class of the United States Military Academy in the early 19th century. The film was disagreeable to O'Hara because Payne dropped out and was replaced by George Montgomery, whom she found "positively loathsome". Montgomery attempted to make a pass at her during the production, prolonging his kiss with her after the director had yelled "cut".

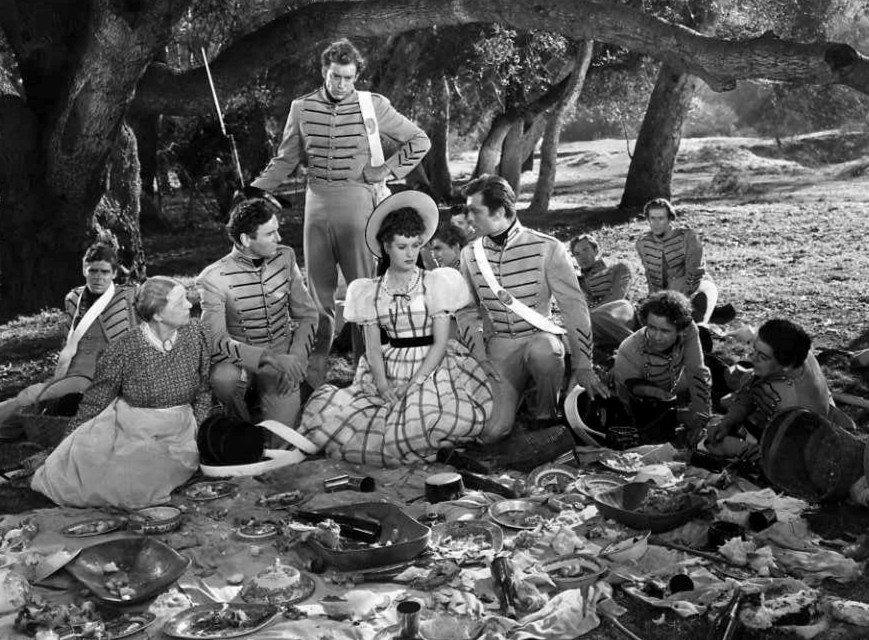
O'Hara in Ten Gentlemen from West Point (1942)

Later that year, O'Hara starred opposite Power, George Sanders, Laird Cregar and Anthony Quinn in Henry King's swashbuckler The Black Swan. O'Hara recalled that it was "everything you could want in a lavish pirate picture: a magnificent ship with thundering cannons; a dashing hero battling menacing villains ... sword fights; fabulous costumes ...". She found it exhilarating working with Power, who was renowned for his "wicked sense of humor". O'Hara grew very concerned about one scene in the picture in which she is thrown overboard in her underwear by Power, and sent a warning letter home to Ireland in advance. She refused to take her wedding ring off in one scene which resulted in screen adjustments to make it look like a dinner ring. Though the film was praised by critics and is seen as one of the period's most enjoyable adventure films, the critic from The New York Times thought O'Hara's character lacked depth, commenting that "Maureen O'Hara is brunette and beautiful—which is all the part requires".

O'Hara played the love interest of Henry Fonda in the 1943 war picture Immortal Sergeant. O'Hara noted that Fonda was studying for his service entry exams at the time and had his head in books between takes, and that 20th Century Fox publicized one of the last love scenes between them in the film as Fonda's last screen kiss before entering the war. She next portrayed a European school teacher opposite George Sanders and Charles Laughton, in their last film together, in Jean Renoir's This Land Is Mine for RKO. At the end of a court case in the film, during a hearty speech by Laughton, O'Hara is shown teary-eyed on screen for a prolonged period. Malone thought her performance was effective, both crying and smiling, though considered Renoir to have overdone the film and confused the audience as a result.

Later, she had a role in Richard Wallace's The Fallen Sparrow opposite John Garfield, whom she described as "my shortest leading man, an outspoken Communist and a real sweetheart". Malone states that despite the two working together effectively on the film, Garfield was not overly impressed with her acting. Malone considers This Land is Mine and The Fallen Sparrow to have been two important pictures in O'Hara's career, "adding to her growing prestige in the film industry", and helping her "crawl out from the gimcrack melodrama of adventure films".

=== 1944–1949: The Queen of Technicolor ===
"Ms. O'Hara was called the Queen of Technicolor because when that film process first came into use, nothing seemed to show off its splendor better than her rich red hair, bright green eyes and flawless peaches-and-cream complexion. One critic praised her in an otherwise negative review of the 1950 film "Comanche Territory" with the sentiment "Framed in Technicolor, Miss O'Hara somehow seems more significant than a setting sun." Even the creators of the process claimed her as its best advertisement."

— Anita Gates of The New York Times on O'Hara as "The Queen of Technicolor"

Although O'Hara became known as the "Queen of Technicolor" (like Rhonda Fleming), she professed to dislike the process because it required special cameras and intense light that burned her eyes and gave her klieg eye. She believed that the term negatively affected her career, as most people viewed her solely as a beauty who looked good on film rather than as a talented actress. In 1944 O'Hara was cast opposite Joel McCrea in William A. Wellman's biographical western Buffalo Bill. Though O'Hara did not think that McCrea was rugged enough for the part of William F. "Buffalo Bill" Cody, and according to Malone gave her "little to work off", it did well at the box office. Contrary to O'Hara's opinion, Variety was highly praising of the film, describing it as a "super-western and often a tear-jerker", and thought that McCrea was convincing in the part and that O'Hara's own performance was "satisfactory".

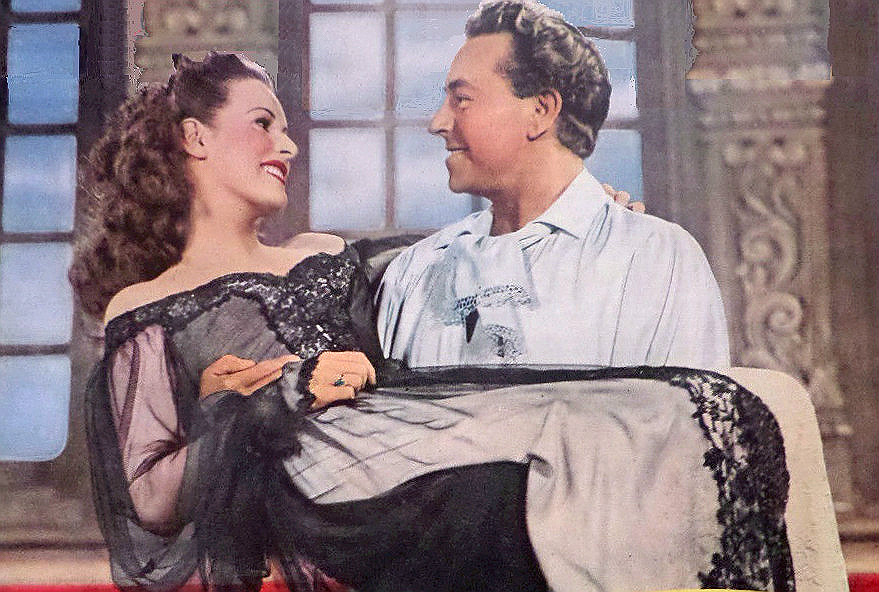
O'Hara with Paul Henreid in The Spanish Main (1945)

In 1945, O'Hara starred opposite Paul Henreid in The Spanish Main as feisty noblewoman Contessa Francesca, the daughter of a Mexican viceroy. O'Hara described it as "one of my more decorative roles", as her character is a particularly aggressive one among the men on a ship, and during the course of the film her face is smothered in chimney soot. O'Hara almost did not win the role when another actress falsely told RKO executive Joe Nolan that she was "as big as a horse" after giving birth to a daughter in 1944. Around this time "an actress named Kathryn" also falsely accused O'Hara of making sexual advances towards her in an elevator, which she believed was a way for the actress to gain attention at the start of her career. During the production of The Spanish Main, O'Hara was visited by John Ford, who was initially turned away for being shabbily dressed, but was later admitted. He informed her about the project that would become The Quiet Man (1952). Malone notes that in the film O'Hara "shows her determination not to leave her sexuality at the birthing stool", commenting that she looks "deliciously fragrant in the splashy histrionics on view here, in RKO's first film in the three-color Technicolor process" O'Hara became a naturalized citizen of the United States on 24 January 1946, and held dual citizenship with the United States and her native Ireland.

In the same year, she portrayed an actress with a fatal heart condition in Walter Lang's Sentimental Journey. A commercially successful production, O'Hara described it as a "rip-your-heart-out tearjerker that reduced my agents and the toughest brass at Fox to mush when they saw it". It was poorly received by critics, and was later declared by Harvard as the worst film of all time. One critic attacked O'Hara as "just another one of those precious Hollywood juvenile products who in workday life would benefit from a good hiding", while Bosley Crowther dismissed the film as a "compound of hackneyed situations, maudlin dialogue and preposterously bad acting". In Gregory Ratoff's musical Do You Love Me, O'Hara portrayed a prim, bespectacled music school dean who transforms herself into a desirable, sophisticated lady in the big city. She commented that it was "one of the worst pictures I ever made". It frustrated her that she could not put her talents to good use, to not even sing in it.

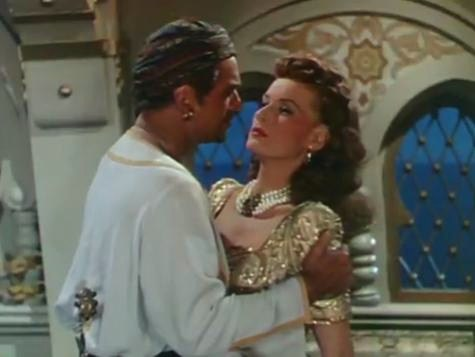
Douglas Fairbanks Jr. and O'Hara in the trailer for Sinbad the Sailor (1947)

O'Hara was offered roles in The Razor's Edge (1946), which went to Tierney, John Wayne's film Tycoon (1947), which went to Laraine Day, and Bob Hope's The Paleface, which went to Jane Russell. She turned down the role in The Paleface as she was going through a turbulent period in her personal life and "didn't think I would be able to laugh every day and have fun". She later deeply regretted turning it down and confessed that she'd made a "terrible mistake". In 1947, O'Hara starred opposite Douglas Fairbanks Jr. as Shireen in the adventure film Sinbad the Sailor. O'Hara plays a glamorous adventuress who assists Sinbad (Fairbanks) locate the hidden treasure of Alexander the Great. She found the scenario to be "ridiculous", but stated that it made a "pot of money for RKO—action-adventures almost always did". Malone wrote: "O'Hara looks splendid and gets to wear some of the most stunning costumes of her career—a different one in almost every scene—but her dialogue is floridly empty. She exudes potential in early scenes, where her air of sybaritic slyness seems promise she'll be something more than window dressing", but thought the film "totally lacked drama". The critic from The New York Times thought that O'Hara excessive costume changes made watching her an "exhausting" experience".

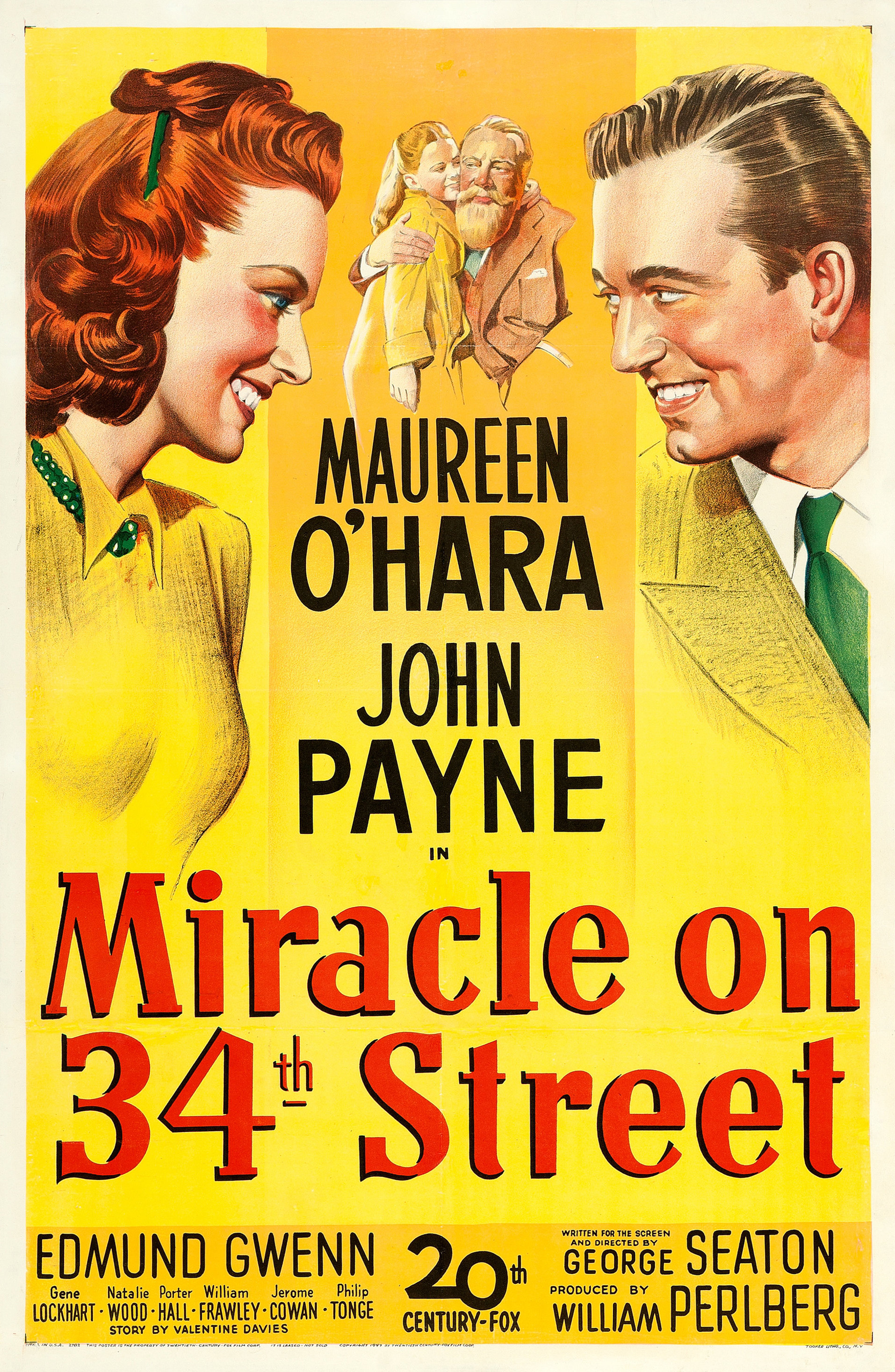
Film poster for Miracle on 34th Street (1947)

After a role as the Bostonian love interest of Cornel Wilde in Humberstone's The Homestretch (1947), O'Hara had grown frustrated with Hollywood and took a considerable break to return to her native Ireland, where people thought she did not look well, having lost a lot of weight. While there she received a call from 20th Century Fox to portray the role of Doris Walker, the mother of Susan Walker (played by a young Natalie Wood) in the Christmas film, Miracle on 34th Street (1947). It became a perennial Christmas classic, with a traditional network television airing every Thanksgiving Day on NBC. On Natalie Wood, O'Hara said: "I have been mother to almost forty children in movies, but I always had a special place in my heart for little Natalie. She always called me Mamma Maureen and I called her Natasha ... when Natalie and I shot the scenes in Macy's, we had to do them at night because the store was full of people doing their Christmas shopping during the day. Natalie loved this because it meant she was allowed to stay up late. I really enjoyed this time with Natalie. We loved to walk through the quiet, closed store and look at all the toys and girls' dresses and shoes. The day she died, I cried shamelessly". The film garnered several awards, including an Academy Award nomination for Best Picture.

In O'Hara's last film of 1947, she played a Creole woman opposite Rex Harrison in John M. Stahl's The Foxes of Harrow; the film was set in pre-Civil War New Orleans. TCM state that O'Hara had been "angling" to star in Forever Amber (1947), Fox's big historical romance at the time, but believe that due to a contractual clause, neither of her joint contract owners, Fox and RKO, would accept her appearing in a "major star vehicle" at the time. During the production O'Hara and Harrison intensely disliked each other from the outset, and she found him to be "rude, vulgar and arrogant". Harrison had thought that she disliked him simply because he was English. He reportedly belched in her face during dance sequences and accused her of anti-Semitism, being married to a Jewish woman (Lilli Palmer) at the time, which she vehemently denied. Variety, while acknowledging the length, thought that O'Hara and Harrison carried off their dramatic scenes with "surprising skill". The following year, O'Hara starred opposite Robert Young in the commercially successful comedy film, Sitting Pretty. Bosley Crowther of The New York Times praised O'Hara and Young as husband and wife, remarking that they were "delightfully clever", acting with "elaborate indignation, alternating with good-natured despair".

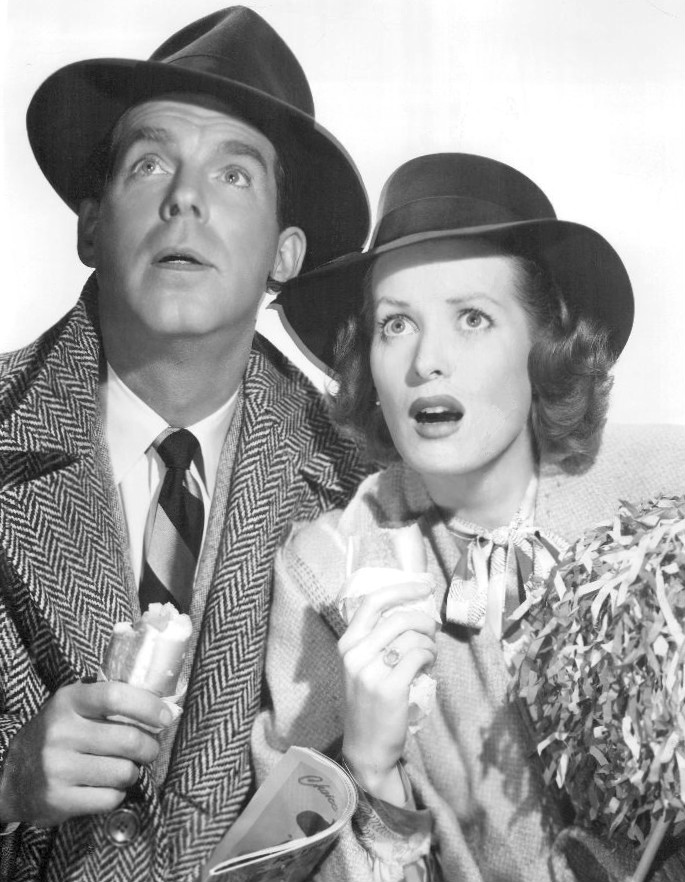
Fred MacMurray and O'Hara in Father Was a Fullback (1949)

In 1949, O'Hara played what she described as a "frustrated talent manager who shoots her star client in a jealous rage" opposite Melvyn Douglas in A Woman's Secret. She only agreed to appear in the production to meet the one-picture-a-year contractual obligation to RKO. It was a box office flop and, at the time, not well received critically—director Nicholas Ray himself was dissatisfied with it. She next had a role as a wealthy widow who falls in love with an alcoholic artist (Dana Andrews) in the Victorian melodrama The Forbidden Street, which was shot at Shepperton Studios in London. O'Hara felt that her performance was poor and admitted that she did not have her heart set on the film. After the poorly received comedy Father Was a Fullback, dismissed by Picturegoer magazine as an "unhappy mixture of Freud and football", she starred in her first film with Universal Pictures, the escapist adventure, Bagdad, portraying Princess Marjan. The film was shot on location in the Alabama Hills of Lone Pine, California. O'Hara noted that the film earned a tremendous amount of money for Universal, and its success led to Universal buying into her RKO contract. Malone wrote that she sings, dances, fights, and loves in a tale of derring-do that ticks all the requisite boxes for an opulent history lesson", adding that "when it came to dexterity in action, O'Hara was a nonpareil".

=== 1950–1957: Work with John Ford, Westerns and adventure films ===
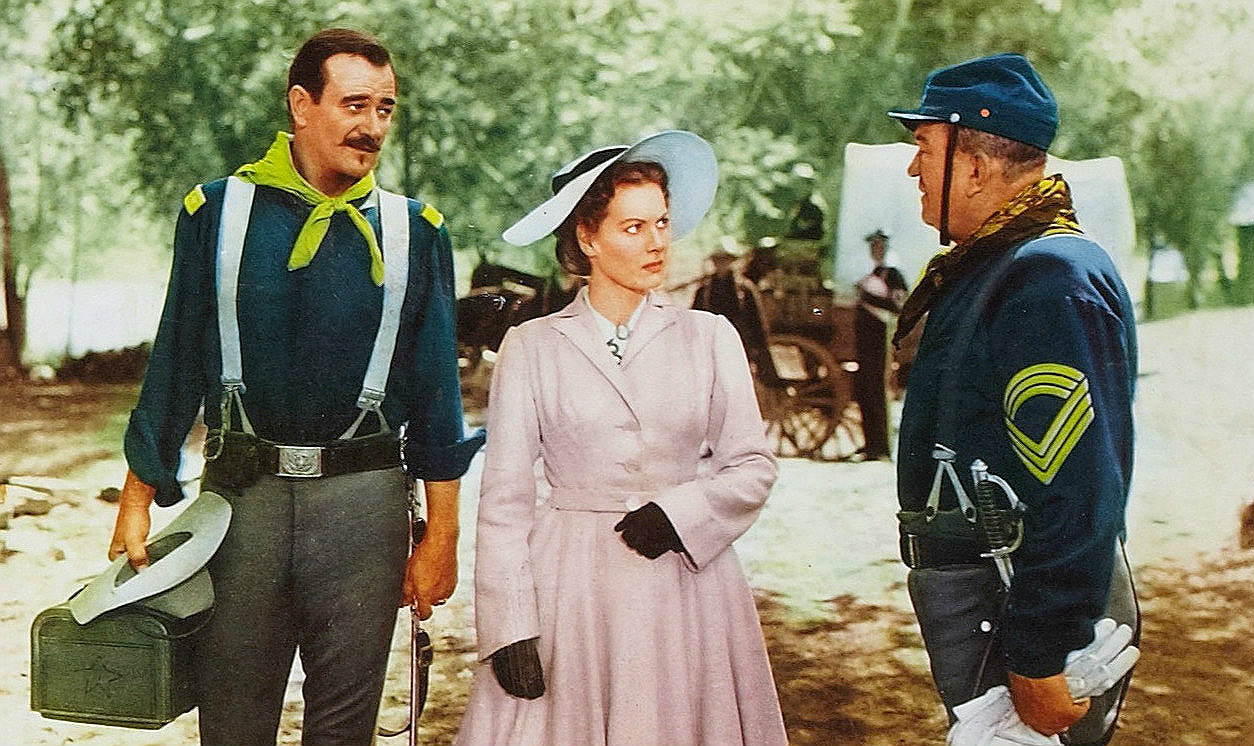
John Wayne, O'Hara and Victor McLaglen in Rio Grande (1950)

In the 1950 Technicolor Western, Comanche Territory, O'Hara played an unusual role as the lead character of Katie Howards, a fiery saloon owner who dresses, behaves and fights like a man, with hair tied back. She "mastered the American bullwhip" during the filming, in a role which Crowther believed was "more significant than a setting sun" in that she "tackles her assignment with so much relish that the rest of the cast, even the Indians, are completely subdued." She received first billing above co-star Macdonald Carey. O'Hara then appeared as Countess D'Arneau opposite John Payne in Tripoli, directed by O'Hara's second husband, William Houston Price. She was next cast by John Ford in the Western Rio Grande, the final installment of his cavalry trilogy. It was the first of five films to be made over 22 years with John Wayne, including The Quiet Man (1952), The Wings of Eagles (1957), McLintock! (1963) and Big Jake (1971), the first three of which were directed by Ford. O'Hara declared that "from our very first scenes together, working with John Wayne was comfortable for me". Her chemistry with Wayne was so powerful that over the years many people assumed that they were married, and newspapers occasionally published sensationalist stories from people claiming to be their love child. In April 1951, she received a call from Universal Pictures that she was cast as a Tunisian princess named Tanya in the swashbuckler film, Flame of Araby (1951). O'Hara "despised" the film and everything it stood for, but had no choice but to make the film or be suspended. By that time, she began to grow tired of the roles she was offered and wanted to perform roles that had more depth than the ones she had done thus far.

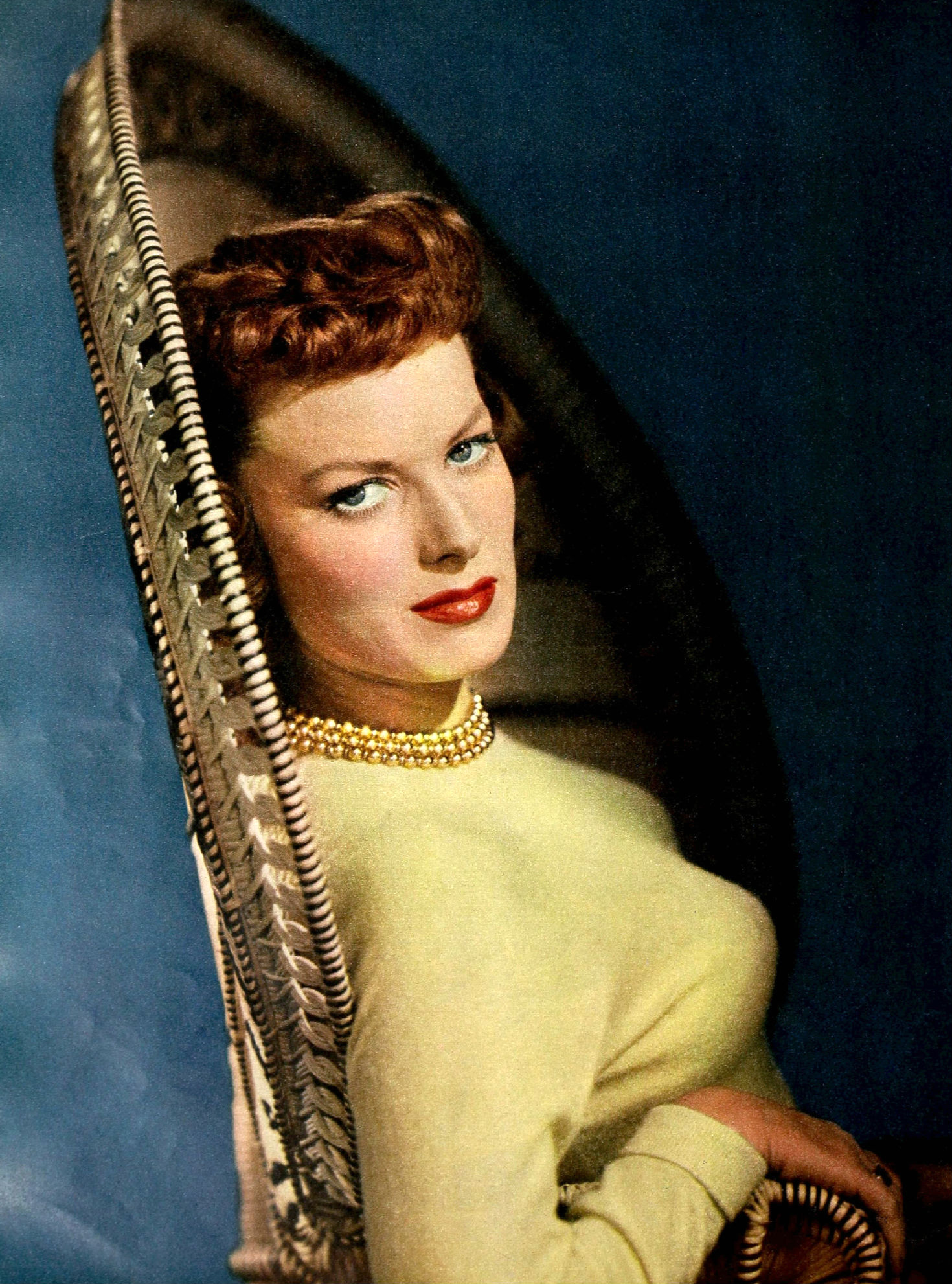
O'Hara in 1950

In 1952, O'Hara played Claire, the daughter of the musketeer, Athos, in At Sword's Point, which according to her showed the "new Maureen O'Hara". The film had actually been made in 1949 but was not released until 1952. The role was the most physically demanding of her career, doing her own stunts and training in the art of fencing for six weeks under Belgian-born fencing master Fred Cavens. She disliked director Lewis Allen and producer Howard Hughes, whom she thought was "cold as ice". The critic from The New York Times appreciated O'Hara's swordsmanship in the film, stating that she was "snarling like a Fury, impales her opponents as though she were threading a needle." O'Hara next played Irish immigrant Australian-based cowgirl, Dell McGuire, in Lewis Milestone's drama Kangaroo (1952), set during the drought of 1900. Kangaroo is noted for being the first Technicolor film to be shot on location in Australia, mostly shot in the desert near Port Augusta. Although O'Hara disliked the production due to changes made to the script, she found the Australians extremely welcoming. The Australian government offered her a plot of land during the production to own permanently, but she turned it down for political reasons, only to later discover that significant oil reserves were on the land.

In 1952, O'Hara starred opposite John Wayne again in Ford's romantic comedy drama, The Quiet Man. Shot on location in Cong, County Mayo, Ireland, O'Hara described the film as her "personal favourite of all the pictures I have made. It is the one I am most proud of, and I tend to be very protective of it. I loved Mary Kate Danaher. I loved the hell and fire in her." Malone notes that she rarely appeared in an interview without mentioning this fact. O'Hara was disconcerted with Ford's harsh treatment of Wayne during the production and constant ribbing. Though Ford generally treated her very well, on one occasion when filming a cart scene in which the wind in her eyes made it difficult to see, Ford yelled "Open your damn eyes" and O'Hara flipped, responding with "What would a bald-headed son of a bitch like you know about hair lashing across his eyeballs?"

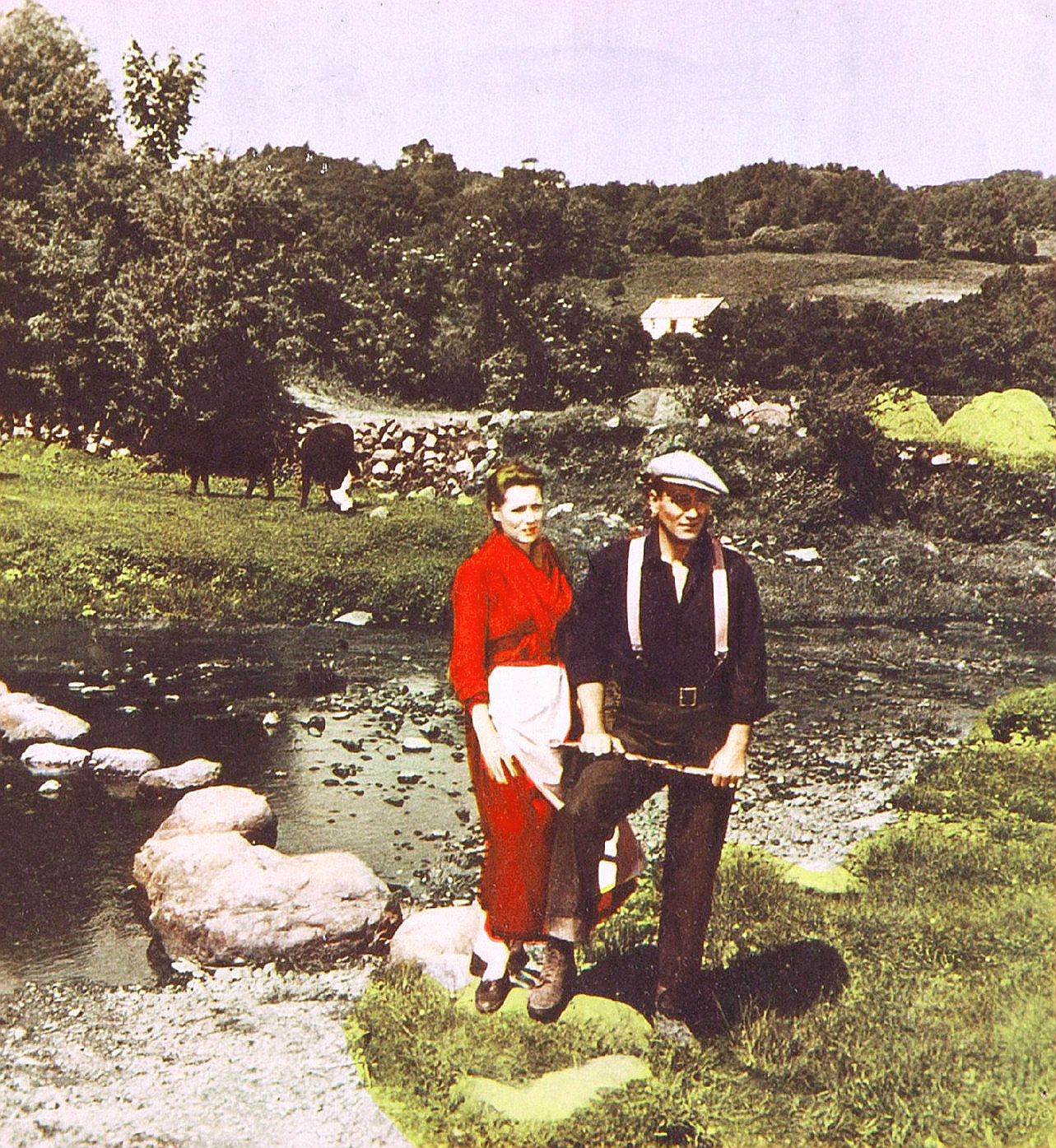
O'Hara and John Wayne in The Quiet Man (1952)

The Quiet Man was both a critical and commercial success, grossing $3.8 million domestically in its first year of release against a budget of $1.75 million. Film critic James Berardinelli called O'Hara "the perfect match for Wayne" and that "she never allows him to steal a scene without a fight, and occasionally snatches one away from him on her own", while film critic and sports writer Danny Peary praised their chemistry, "exhibiting strength" through "love, vulnerability and tenderness". According to Harry Carey Jr., who noted that O'Hara held a strong gaze with Wayne in all of the films they made together, director Ford was uncomfortable with the romantic scenes in the film and refused to shoot the scene until the last day. The film was nominated for six Academy Awards including Best Picture, though O'Hara was devastated at not even being nominated for an award. Film director Martin Scorsese called The Quiet Man "one of the greatest movies of all time", and in 1996 it topped a poll of the greatest films in the Irish Times.

O'Hara's last release of 1952 was Against All Flags opposite Errol Flynn, marking her only collaboration with the actor. O'Hara, knowing Flynn's reputation as a womanizer, was on close guard during the production. Though she "respected him professionally and was quite fond of him personally" she found Flynn's alcoholism a problem and remarked that "if the director prohibited alcohol on the set, then Errol would inject oranges with booze and eat them during breaks". According to Steve Jacques, O'Hara outdid Flynn in the combat scenes, many of which had to be cut from the final version to protect Flynn's heroic image. The film was a commercially successful venture.

The following year she appeared in The Redhead from Wyoming, which she dismissed as "another western stinkeroo for Universal", and appeared in another western with Jeff Chandler, War Arrow. O'Hara noted that "Jeff was a real sweetheart, but acting with him was like acting with a broomstick".

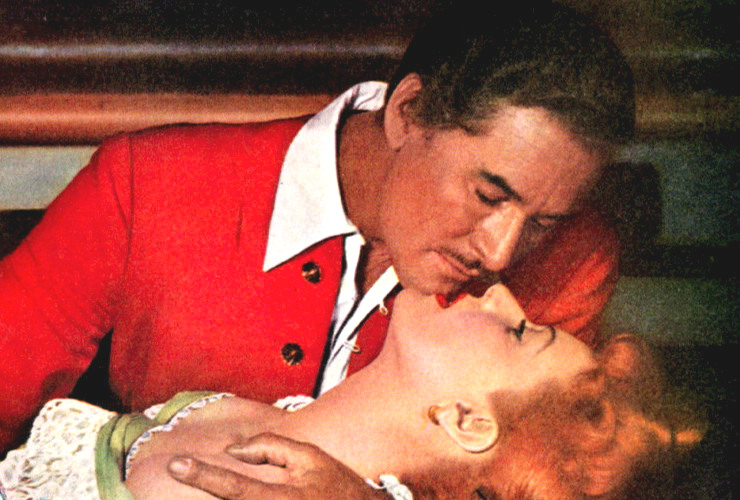
O'Hara with Errol Flynn in Against All Flags (1952)

In 1954, O'Hara starred in Malaga, also known as Fire over Africa, which was shot on location in Spain. O'Hara played a Mata Hari-like character, a secret agent who attempts to find the ringleader of a smuggling ring in Tangiers. Malone compares the relationship in the film between O'Hara as Joanne and Macdonald Carey as agent Van Logan to that of Bogart and Bacall, with frequent verbal sparring. The Monthly Film Bulletin wrote: "Maureen O'Hara looks very handsome in Technicolor but her expressions are limited—mostly to disgust at shooting smugglers or pulling knives from dying men".

In 1955, O'Hara made her fourth picture with Ford, The Long Gray Line, which she considered being "by far the most difficult" due to declining relations with Ford. John Wayne had originally intended co-starring, but due to a conflicting schedule O'Hara recommended Tyrone Power in replacement. Malone notes that the Irish accents by O'Hara and Power are overdone, and that there is little trace of a Donegal accent in it. The film production marked the lowest point of O'Hara's relationship with Ford, and each day he would greet her with "Well, did Herself have a good shit this morning?". He would ask the crew if she was in a good mood, and if that was the case, he would say "then we're going to have a horrible day" and vice versa. He would provoke her by telling her to "move her fat Irish ass". Their relationship deteriorated further when O'Hara reportedly saw him kissing an actor on set; Ford knew that she thought he was a closeted homosexual. In The Magnificent Matador, O'Hara played a spoiled, wealthy American who falls in love with a brooding, tormented, about-to-retire matador (Anthony Quinn) in Mexico. Ava Gardner, who was dating a bullfighter in real life, Luis Miguel Dominguín, and Lana Turner were considered for O'Hara's part of Karen Harrison. The film was panned by the critics. One of her best-known roles came later year, playing Lady Godiva in Lady Godiva of Coventry. Contrary to what Universal claimed to the press, O'Hara was not nude in the film, wearing a "full-length body leotard and underwear that was concealed by my long tresses".

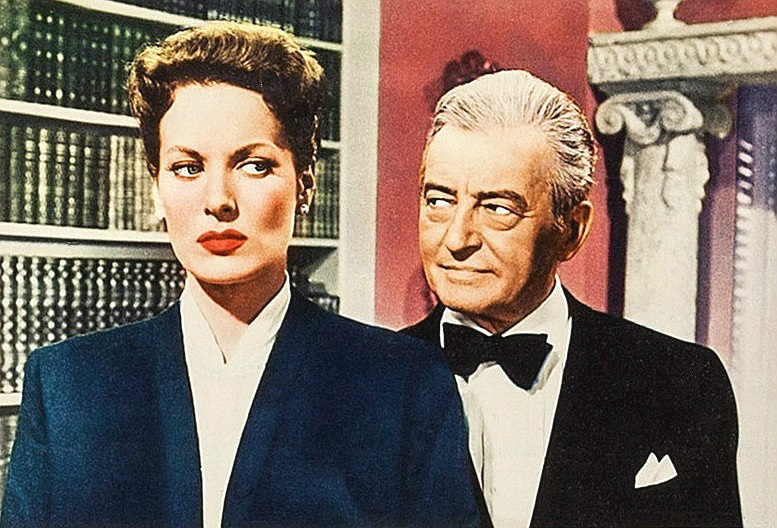
O'Hara and Claude Rains in Lisbon (1956)

In December 1955, O'Hara negotiated a new five-picture contract with Columbia Pictures boss Harry Cohn, with $85,000 per picture.

The following year, she starred in the Portuguese-set melodramatic mystery film Lisbon for Republic Pictures. For the first time in her career she played a villain, and remarked that "Bette Davis was right—bitches are fun to play". In the film, the first Hollywood production to be shot in Portugal, she is caught in a love triangle with Ray Milland and Claude Rains, who according to Malone both attempted to "outsuave each other" during the whole production. Later that year she made Everything But the Truth for Universal, at a time in her career when she was trying to distance herself from adventure films. O'Hara thought the film was so bad that neither she nor her family saw it, though she enjoyed working with John Forsythe.

"For years I wondered why John Ford grew to hate me so much. I couldn't understand what made him say and do so many terrible things to me. I realize now that he didn't hate me at all. He loved me very much and even thought that he was in love with me".

— O'Hara on John Ford

In 1957, O'Hara marked the end of her collaboration with John Ford with The Wings of Eagles, which was based on the true story of an old friend of Ford's, Frank "Spig" Wead, a naval aviator who became a screenwriter in Hollywood. Malone wrote that "Wayne and O'Hara interact well in these early scenes, giving effortless performances and exhibiting a strong chemistry. One can sense the offscreen friendship in little nuances between them". Though not a major commercial success, it fared better in the eyes of the critics. The relationship between O'Hara and Ford grew increasingly bitter, and that year he referred to her as a "greedy bitch" to director Joseph McBride, who had shown an interest in casting her for The Rising of the Moon. O'Hara later referred to him as an "instant conman" who would say the opposite of what he felt and said of his bitterness: "He wanted to be born in Ireland and he wanted to be an Irish rebel. The fact that he wasn't left him very bitter".

=== 1959–2000: Later career ===
"When we arrived in Havana on April 15, 1959, Cuba was a country experiencing revolutionary change. Only four months before, Fidel Castro and his supporters had toppled Fulgencio Batista ... Che Guevara was often at the Capri Hotel. Che would talk about Ireland and all the guerilla warfare that had taken place there. He knew every battle in Ireland and all of its history. And I finally asked, "Che, you know so much about Ireland and talk constantly about it. How do you know so much?" He said, "Well, my grandmother's name was Lynch and I learned everything I know about Ireland at her knee." He was Che Guevara Lynch! That famous cap he wore was an Irish rebel's cap. I spent a great deal of time with Che Guevara while I was in Havana. Today he is a symbol for freedom fighters wherever they are in the world and I think he is a good one".

— O'Hara on filming Our Man in Havana in Havana and meeting Che Guevara

Although O'Hara was consciously moving away from adventure films, an ongoing court case against Confidential magazine in 1957 and 1958 and an operation for a slipped disk, after which she had to wear a full body brace for four months, effectively ruled out any further action films for her. During this period away from film she took lessons in singing to improve her abilities. O'Hara had a soprano voice and described singing as her first love, which she was able to channel through television. In the late 1950s and early 1960s, she was a guest on musical variety shows with Perry Como, Andy Williams, Betty Grable and Tennessee Ernie Ford. In 1960, O'Hara starred on Broadway in the musical Christine which ran for 12 performances. It was a problematic production, and the director, Jerome Chodorov, was so displeased with it that he requested that his name be removed from the credits. She found her Broadway failure to be a "major disappointment" and returned to Hollywood. That year she released two recordings, Love Letters from Maureen O'Hara and Maureen O'Hara Sings her Favorite Irish Songs. She described Love Letters from Maureen O'Hara, a moderate success, as an act of revenge, given that Hollywood would not let her appear in a musical.

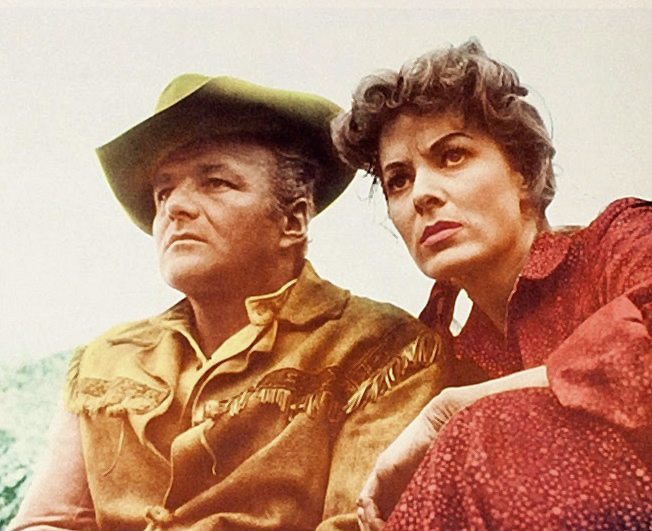
O'Hara with Brian Keith in The Deadly Companions (1961)

In 1959, O'Hara returned to film, starring as a secretary who is sent from London to Havana to assist a British secret agent (Alec Guinness) in the commercially successful Our Man in Havana. O'Hara beat Lauren Bacall to the role as she was busy with other engagements. Though the film was critically acclaimed, Crowther of The New York Times felt that the characters of O'Hara and the daughter could have been made "more humorous and spirited than they are". The following year, O'Hara appeared in the CBS television film, Mrs. Miniver, but despite some critics approving her performance, most thought that the remake was ill-timed and that she could not top Greer Garson's performance in the 1942 Oscar-winning film.

In 1961, O'Hara portrayed Kit Tilden in the western The Deadly Companions, Sam Peckinpah's feature-film debut. Playing against stereotype as the strong, aggressive redhead, she plays a character who is vulnerable to rape and violence from men. The plot involves her traveling across Apache territory with an ex-Sergeant to bury her young son next to his father in the desert. Malone considered her character in the film to be "radically underdeveloped". While O'Hara acknowledged that Peckinpah later "reached icon status as a great director of westerns", she thought he was "just awful" and "one of the strangest and most objectionable people I had ever worked with". Later that year she starred in The Parent Trap, one of her most popular films, opposite a young Hayley Mills. Filmed just before The Deadly Companions (but released just after), she co-starred with Brian Keith in both films. O'Hara credits Mills for the success of the film, remarking that "she really did bring two different girls to life in the movie" and wrote that "Sharon and Susan were so believable that I'd sometimes forget myself and look for the other one when Hayley and I were standing around the set". Malone notes that this was the film that she "made a transition from comely maiden to trendy mother", one which received some of the best critical plaudits of her career. O'Hara was subsequently involved in a legal dispute with Walt Disney, backed by the Screen Actors Guild, over billing for the film. She never worked for Disney again.

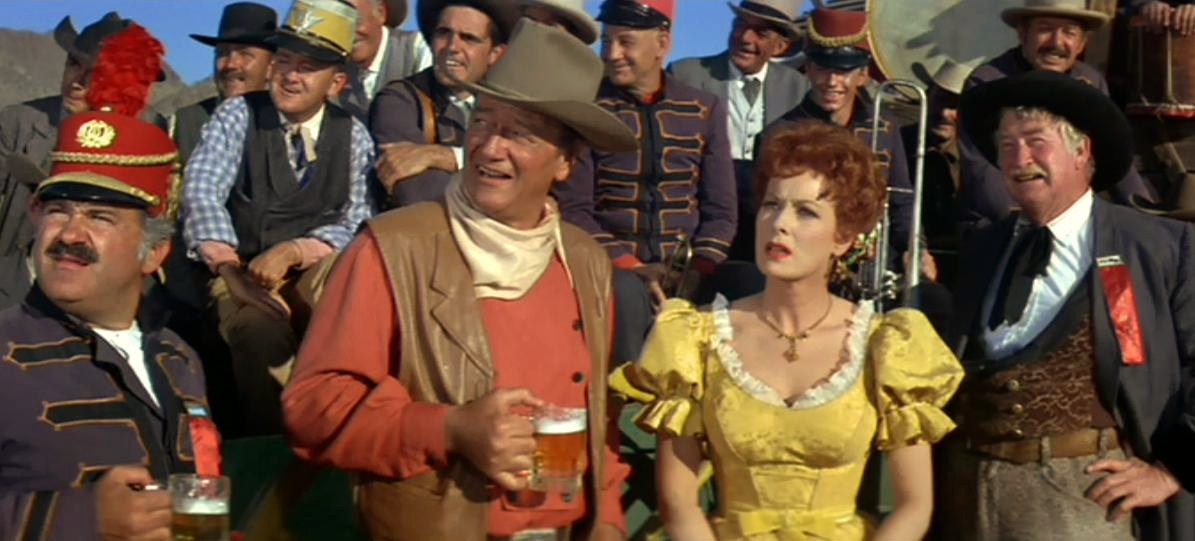
Jack Kruschen, John Wayne, O'Hara and Chill Wills in McLintock! (1963)

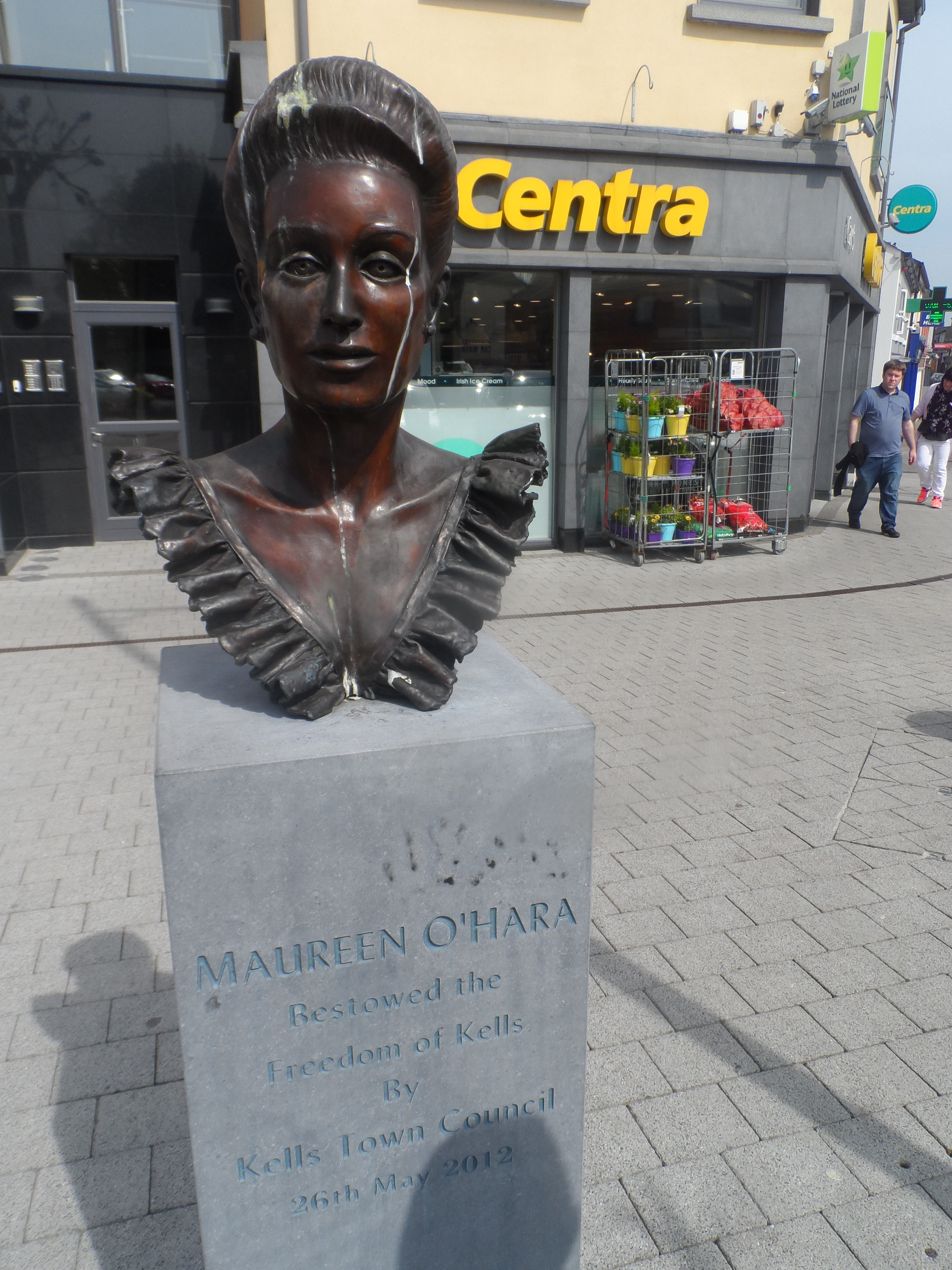
Bust of O'Hara in Kells, Ireland

The following year, O'Hara appeared opposite James Stewart in Mr. Hobbs Takes a Vacation, about a family vacation in a dilapidated house on the beach. She played Peggy, the wife of Hobbs (Stewart), a character who is very family-oriented and talkative. Though the two became friends, O'Hara confessed that she was not happy with the dynamic between her and Stewart onscreen, commenting that "every scene revolves around Jimmy Stewart. I was never allowed to really play out a single scene in the picture. He was a remarkable actor, but not a generous one". With the success of The Parent Trap and Mr. Hobbs Takes a Vacation, O'Hara felt that her career had been given a new lease of life. She united with Henry Fonda after 20 years to appear in Spencer's Mountain (1963), roughly based on the novel by Earl Hamner Jr. The film was shot on location in Jackson Hole, Wyoming, the same place that the classic 1953 western Shane was shot. O'Hara played Olivia Spencer, the devout Christian wife of Fonda's atheist character, who during the course of the film sings a hymn at an outdoor funeral. Though Malone considers her to have given a "commendable performance", he thought she lacked chemistry with Fonda and notes that the film came at a difficult period in his life, with the breakdown of his third marriage. It was poorly received by the critics at the time, but fared well at the box office. Later in 1963 she starred with John Wayne in Andrew V. McLaglen's Technicolor comedic western, McLintock!. O'Hara performed many of her own stunts in the film, including one scene where she falls backwards off a ladder into a trough.

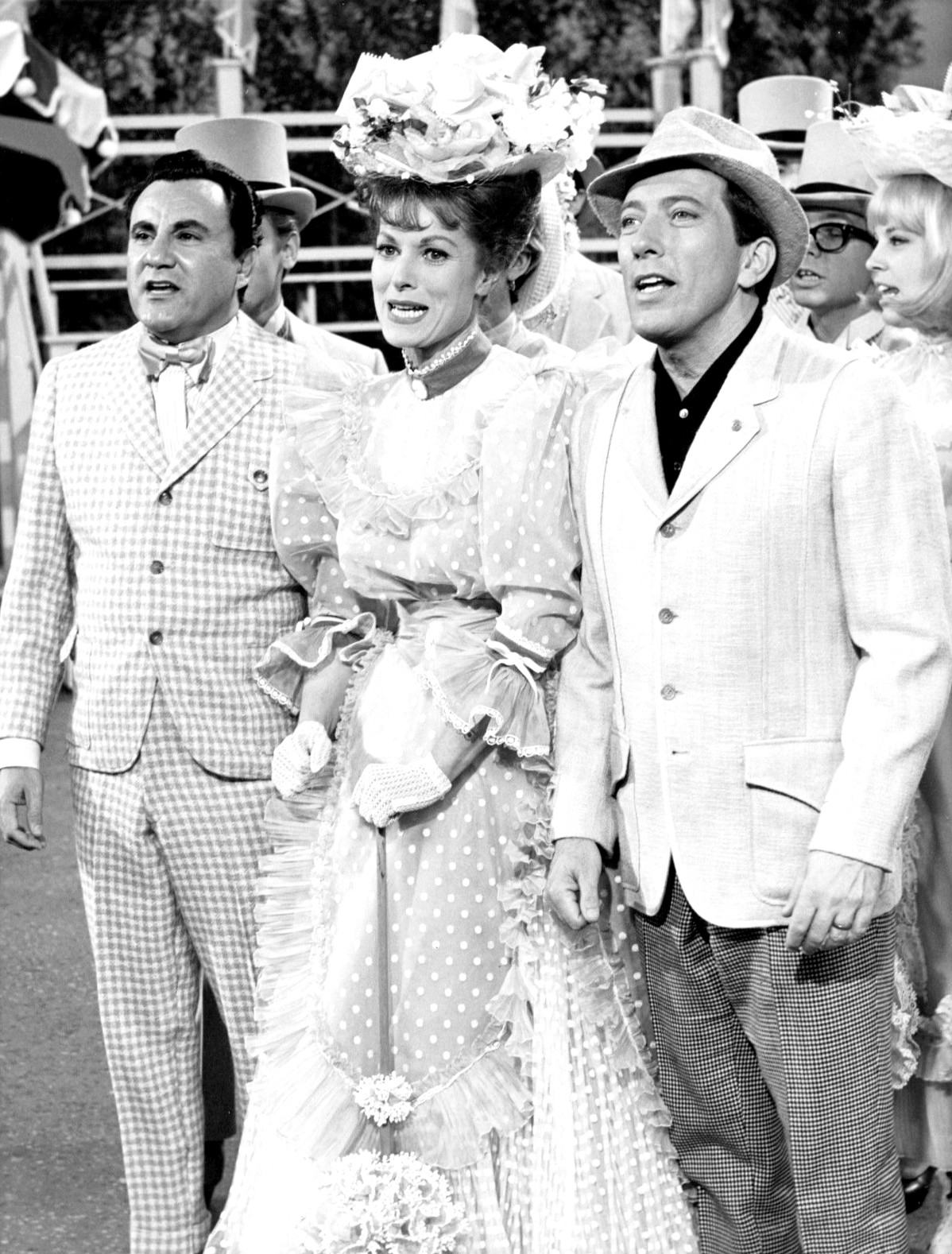
O'Hara on The Andy Williams Show in 1965

In late 1964, O'Hara went to Italy to shoot The Battle of the Villa Fiorita (1965) with Rossano Brazzi. O'Hara played a British woman who leaves her diplomat husband in England for an Italian pianist (Brazzi). She had high expectations for the film but soon realized that Brazzi was miscast. She was so frustrated with the finished film, which was a box office flop, that she cried. O'Hara made her last picture with James Stewart the following year in the comedic western, The Rare Breed. Malone thought that she modeled her performance on Julie Andrews, "adopting a schoolmarmish voice and demeanor that ill befit her", and coming out with pious statements like "cleanliness is next to godliness".

In 1970, O'Hara starred opposite Jackie Gleason in How Do I Love Thee?. During filming in the summer of 1969, O'Hara was involved in an accident on set with Gleason when he tripped on a Cyclone wire fence, falling heavily on her hand, which was resting on it. She later required orthopedic surgery to correct the injury. Though she got on well with Gleason, O'Hara remarked that it was a "terrible film. The script was awful, and the director couldn't fix it". The film was poorly received critically, with The Guardian calling it "the most mawkish film of the year/decade/era". In October of that year, she made her last film with Wayne in Big Jake (1971), shot on location in Durango, Mexico. Director Budd Boetticher cast O'Hara as he believed that she and Wayne had chemistry which was "head and shoulders" over those of other leading actresses at the time. After Big Jake, O'Hara retired from the industry. In 1972, she professed to strongly disapprove of the way Hollywood was going, "making dirty pictures", and she wanted no part of it. That year, she was asked to give a speech at the Lifetime Achievement Award ceremony for John Ford, which was the last occasion she saw him before his death on 31 August 1973.

"There's only one woman who has been my friend over the years, and by that I mean a real friend, like a man would be. That woman is Maureen O'Hara. She's big, lusty, absolutely marvelous—definitely my kind of woman. She's a great guy. I've had many friends, and I prefer the company of men. Except for Maureen O'Hara".

— John Wayne on O'Hara

After a 20-year retirement from the film industry, O'Hara returned to the screen in 1991 to star opposite John Candy in the romantic comedy drama Only the Lonely. She played Rose Muldoon, the domineering Irish mother of a Chicago cop (Candy), who has an indifference to Sicilians. The film reunited her with Anthony Quinn who plays her brief love interest, Nick the Greek. O'Hara stated of her return: "Twenty years is a long time, but it was surprising how little changed. The equipment is lighter now, and they work a bit faster, but I hardly felt like I'd been away". She described Candy as "one of my all-time favorite leading men", and was surprised by the extent of his talent, remarking that he was a "comedic genius but an actor with an extraordinary dramatic talent" who very much reminded her of Charles Laughton. In the following years, she continued to work, starring in several made-for-TV films, including The Christmas Box, Cab to Canada with Catherine Bell, and The Last Dance before retiring permanently in 2000.

== Reception and character ==
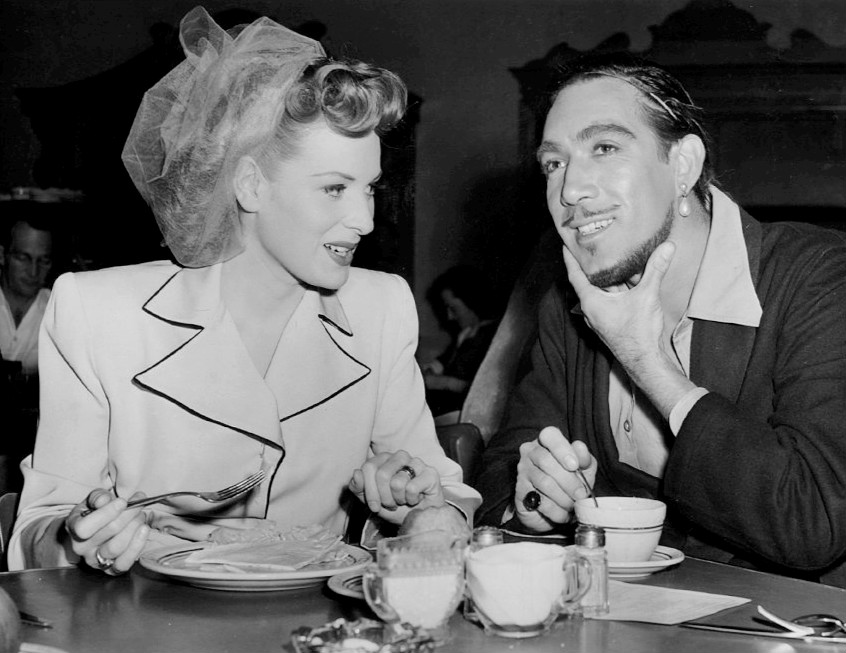
O'Hara having lunch with Anthony Quinn behind the scenes of the film Sinbad the Sailor (1947)

Malone states that as "Ireland's first Hollywood superstar", O'Hara "paved the way for a future generation of actresses seeking their own voice ... With her mahogany hair, her hoydenish ways, and her whip-smart delivery of lines, she created a character prototype that seemed to define her country of origin as much as Ireland defined her". He notes though that O'Hara was "loved for her naturalness" and her "lack of a diva quality". She dismissed method acting as "tommyrot", believing that acting should be acting, and placed great emphasis on work ethic and punctuality. Insisting on doing her own stunts, O'Hara became so prone to injuries during her productions that her colleagues remarked that she "should have been awarded a Purple Heart". Her closest rival in the 1950s was Rhonda Fleming, the two both being prolific in westerns and action films.

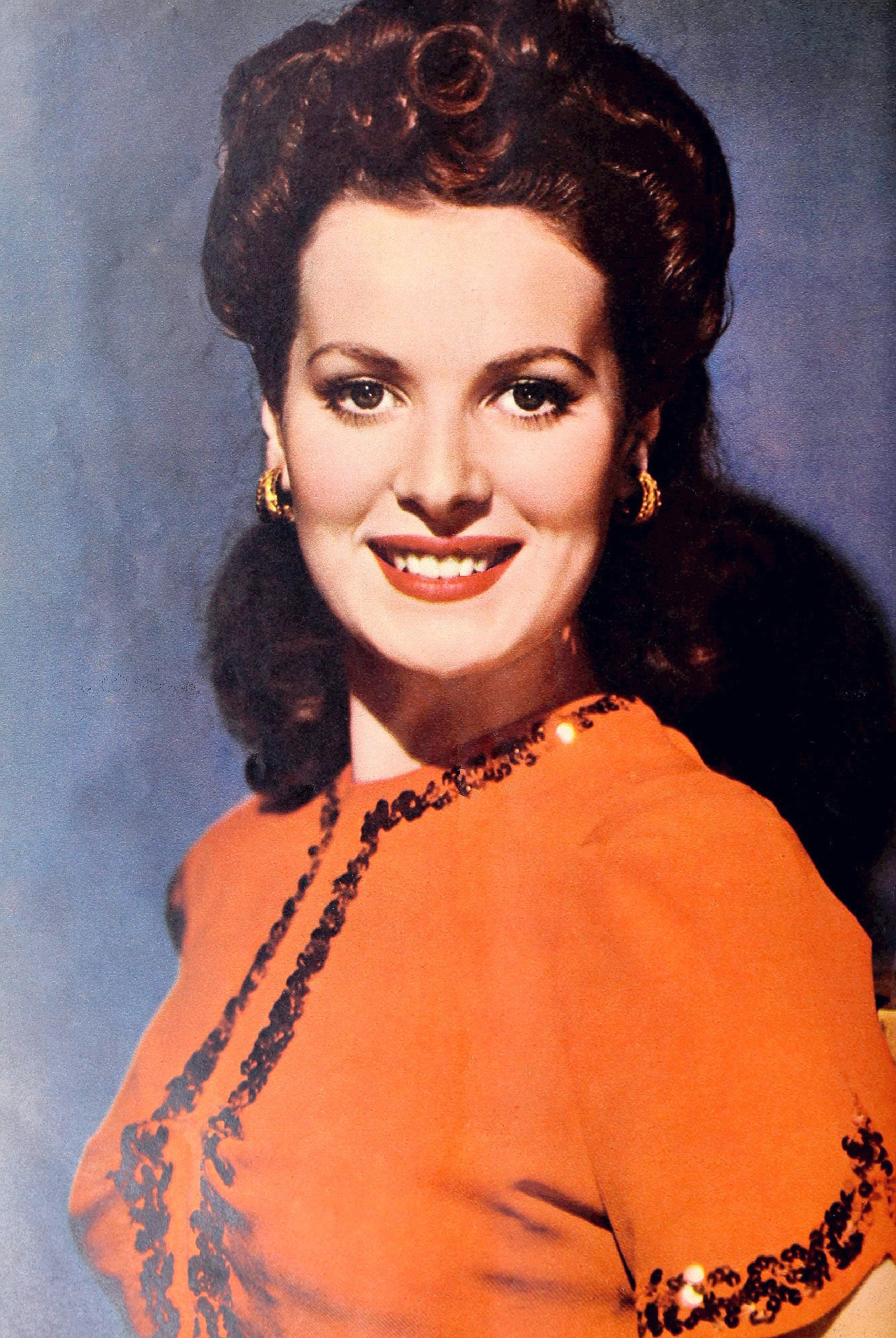
O'Hara in April 1942

John Ford reportedly once commented in a letter that O'Hara was the finest actress in Hollywood, but he rarely praised her in person. In an interview with Bertrand Tavernier, on the other hand, Ford professed that O'Hara was one of the actresses he most detested. Though she was quite proud of her own versatility as an actress, saying "I played every kind of role. I was never petite or cute so there was never anything about me which would go out of style", critics found fault with her range. Malone wrote that she "seemed to struggle in comedic roles but proved her mettle in films that called on her to take charge of situations or find courage in the face of adversity". One 2013 critic asserted that it took a director like John Ford to bring out a good performance from her. The Irish critic Philip Moloy thought the opposite, saying, "It is not something that she would accept herself, but Maureen O'Hara's career probably suffered from its long-term association with John Ford. John Ford's view of Ireland, and things Irish, tended to be broad, sentimental and sociologically distorted, and his characters were often clichéd representatives of their nationality". In the 1960s, O'Hara ventured into maturer roles as she aged.

O'Hara had a reputation in Hollywood for bossiness, and John Wayne once referred to her as "the greatest guy I ever met". Rick Kogan of The Chicago Tribune quotes her in saying that she and Wayne shared many similarities, and took "no nonsense from anybody". She was friends with Zanuck and Harry Cohn, the boss of Columbia Pictures, who was notorious for being the "nastiest man in Hollywood". Film executives respected the fact that she was bold and completely honest towards them. O'Hara declared that she had "never had a temperamental fit in my life", but did admit to walking off the set in disgust at George Montgomery nearly choking her to death with a kiss during the filming of Ten Gentleman from West Point.

"It's been a good life ... I've had a wonderful career and enjoyed making movies. I was fortunate to have made pictures with many of the greats, both actors and directors. I've no regrets ... Some people see me as a former screen siren while others remember me as the dame who gave as good as she got in movies with John Wayne, for example. Many women have written to me over the years and said I've been an inspiration to them, a woman who could hold her own against the world." The final thing she said, "Above all else, deep in my soul, I'm a tough Irish Woman."

— O'Hara reflecting on her long life and career, on her 95th birthday in August 2015, at the home of her grandson, Conor, in Idaho

Teetotaler and non-smoker, O'Hara rejected the Hollywood party lifestyle, and was relatively moderate in her personal grooming. In her earlier career she refused to appear to smoke and drink on screen, and it was only later that she relented to avoid being out of a job. O'Hara was considered to be prudish in Hollywood. Malone wrote that "her attitude towards sex bordered on puritanical at times, which wasn't what one expected from a sex symbol". When asked why she would not pose for scantily clad photographs O'Hara remarked: "I come from a very strict family, and I can't do some of the things other actresses can because my folks in Dublin would think I turned out bad", and in 1948 she stated that she wouldn't be photographed in a bathing suit "Because I don't think I looked like Lana Turner in a bathing suit, frankly. O'Hara later commented that "I'm not prudish but my training was strict". She believed that her fastidious lifestyle took its toll on her career. She once said, "I'm a helpless victim of a Hollywood whispering campaign. Because I don't let the producer and director kiss me every morning or let them paw me they have spread around town that I am not a woman, that I am a cold piece of marble statuary" and "I wouldn't throw myself on the casting couch, and I know that cost me parts. I wasn't going to play the whore. That wasn't me". She vented her frustration on not being given edgier roles in an interview with the Los Angeles Times, saying "Producers look at a pretty face and think: 'She must have got this far on her looks'. Then comes along a girl with a plain face, and they think, 'She must be a great actress, she isn't pretty'. So they give her the glamour treatment and the pretty girl gets left behind". O'Hara believed that she missed out on a number of roles in some of the classic black-and-white films, because her looks were shown to great advantage in Technicolor productions. Such was her natural beauty that she was one of the few actresses in Hollywood during her career to not undergo cosmetic surgery, though she had one crooked tooth with which she refused to part.

== Personal life and death ==
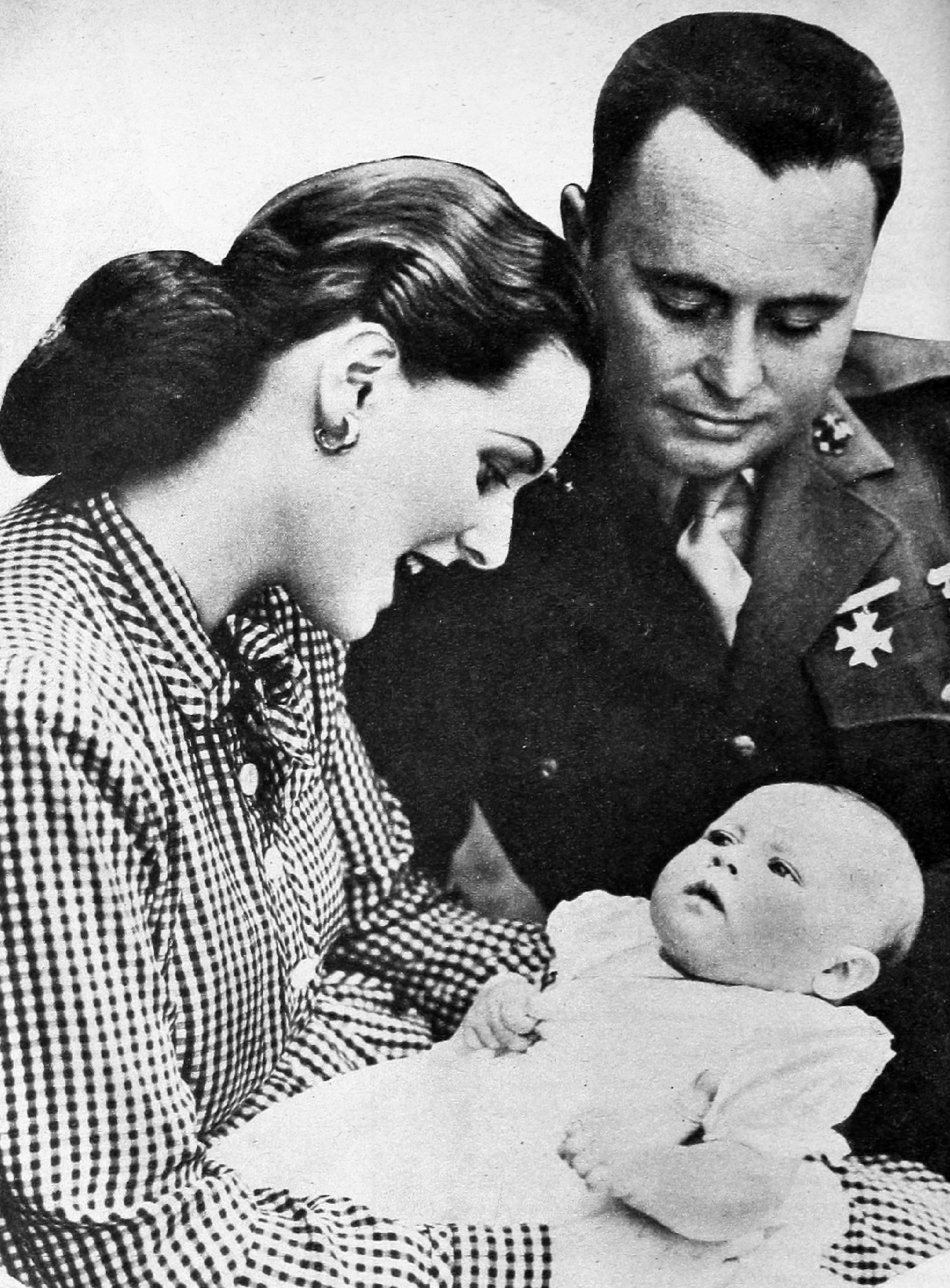
O'Hara and her husband director Will Price and baby Bronwyn in 1944

In 1939, at the age of 18, O'Hara secretly married Englishman George H. Brown, a film producer, production assistant and occasional scriptwriter whom she had met on the set of Jamaica Inn. They married at St Paul's Church in Station Road, Harrow, on 13 June 1939, shortly before she left for Hollywood. Brown stayed behind in England to shoot a film with Paul Robeson. Brown announced that he and O'Hara had kept the marriage a secret and that they would have a full marriage ceremony in October 1939, but O'Hara never returned. The marriage was annulled in 1941. O'Hara became a naturalised American citizen on 25 January 1946.

In December 1941, O'Hara married American film director William Houston Price, who was the dialogue director in The Hunchback of Notre Dame. She lost her virginity to Price on her wedding night and immediately regretted it, recalling thinking to herself, "What the hell have I done now". Soon after the honeymoon, O'Hara realized Price was an alcoholic. The couple had one child, a daughter, Bronwyn Bridget FitzSimons née Price. O'Hara's marriage to Price steadily declined throughout the 1940s due to his alcohol abuse, and she often wanted to file for divorce but felt guilty due to her Catholic beliefs. Price eventually realized the marriage was over and filed for divorce in July 1951 on the grounds of "incompatibility". Price left the house they shared in Bel Air, Los Angeles, on 29 December 1951, on their 10th wedding anniversary.

O'Hara always denied having any extramarital affairs, but in his autobiography, frequent collaborator Anthony Quinn claimed to have fallen in love with her on the set of Sinbad the Sailor. He commented that she was "dazzling, and the most understanding woman on this earth" who "brought out the Gaelic in him", being half Irish. Quinn implied that they had been involved in an affair, adding that "after a while we both tired of the deceit".

From 1953 to 1967, O'Hara had a relationship with Enrique Parra, a wealthy Mexican politician and banker. She met him at a restaurant during a trip to Mexico in 1951. O'Hara stated that Parra "saved me from the darkness of an abusive marriage and brought me back into the warm light of life again. Leaving him was one of the most painful things I have ever had to do." As her relationship with Parra progressed, she began to learn Spanish and even enrolled her daughter in a Mexican school. She moved in 1953 to a smaller property at 10677 Somma Way in Bel Air, amid frequent visits to Mexico City, where she and Parra were very well-known celebrities. She hired a detective to follow Parra in Mexico and found that he was being fully honest about the relationship with his ex-wife and that she could trust him. John Ford intensely disliked Parra, and it affected her relationship with Ford in the 1950s as he often interfered in her affairs and frowned upon the demise of her marriage to Price, being a devout Catholic like O'Hara. Price also continued to harass O'Hara for dating Parra and filed a case against her on 20 June 1955, seeking custody of Bronwyn and accusing her of immorality. O'Hara filed a countersuit, charging him with contempt of court for refusing to pay $50 a month in child support and a $7-a-month alimony. During the publicity stage of The Long Gray Line in 1955, Ford insulted O'Hara and her brother Charles when he remarked to Charles: "if that whore sister of yours can pull herself away from that Mexican long enough to do a little publicity for us, the film might have a chance at some decent returns".

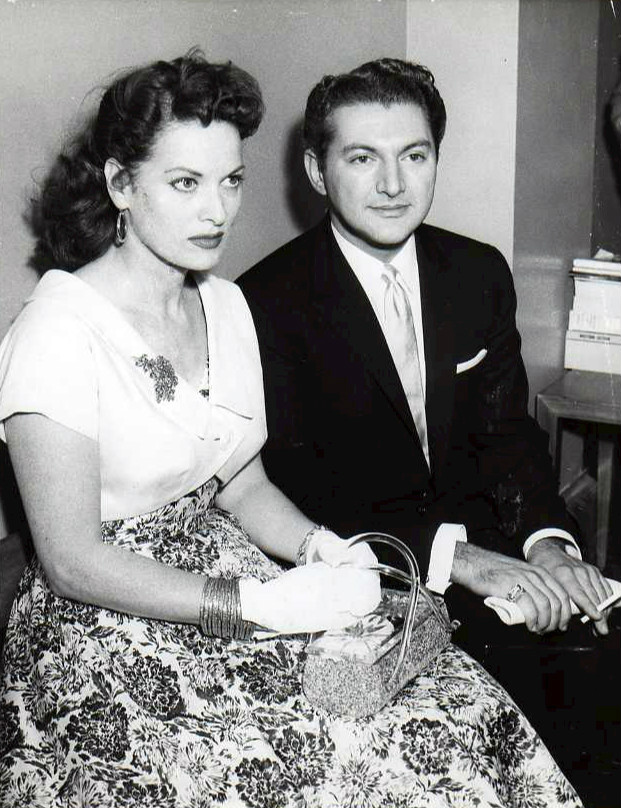
O'Hara with Liberace in 1957

On 9 July 1957, O'Hara filed a $5 million lawsuit against Confidential magazine over allegations it made over her being engaged in sexual activity with Parra during a screening of a film at the Grauman's Chinese Theatre in Hollywood. One of the allegations was "Maureen had entered Grauman's wearing a white silk blouse neatly buttoned. Now it wasn't", and that when the usher shone a flashlight towards them she was forced to sit up and play innocent. O'Hara proved her innocence by presenting a passport showing that she was in Spain shooting Fire Over Africa at the time. She claimed in her autobiography that she became the first actress to win a case against an industry tabloid when Confidential were apparently found guilty of libel and conspiring to publish obscenity, but Malone notes that the trial dragged on for six weeks and the case was actually eventually settled out of court in July 1958.

O'Hara married her third husband, Charles F. Blair Jr., 11 years her senior, on 12 March 1968. Blair, an immensely popular figure, was a pioneer of transatlantic aviation, a former brigadier general of the United States Air Force, a former chief pilot at Pan Am, and founder and head of the United States Virgin Islands airline Antilles Air Boats. A few years after her marriage to Blair, O'Hara, for the most part, retired from acting. In the special features section to the DVD release of The Quiet Man, a story is recounted that O'Hara retired after longtime collaborators John Wayne and John Ford teased her about being married but not being a good, stay-at-home housewife, though Blair himself wanted her to retire from acting and help run his business. Blair died in 1978 in a Grumman Goose belonging to his airline that he was piloting from Saint Croix to St. Thomas that crashed due to an engine failure and pilot error according to the NTSB. O'Hara was elected CEO and president of the airline, with the added distinction of becoming the first woman president of a scheduled airline in the United States.

In 1978, O'Hara was diagnosed with cancer of the uterus, which was treated surgically. She was greatly affected by John Wayne's cancer during this period, and Wayne reportedly wept on the phone when she informed him that her own cancer had been given the all-clear. O'Hara was instrumental in Wayne being awarded the Congressional Gold Medal in 1979, shortly before his death. She argued that "John Wayne is not just an actor. John Wayne is the United States of America" and personally selected the portrait of him to go on the medal. After Wayne's death in June 1979, she fell into deep depression and took several years to recover.

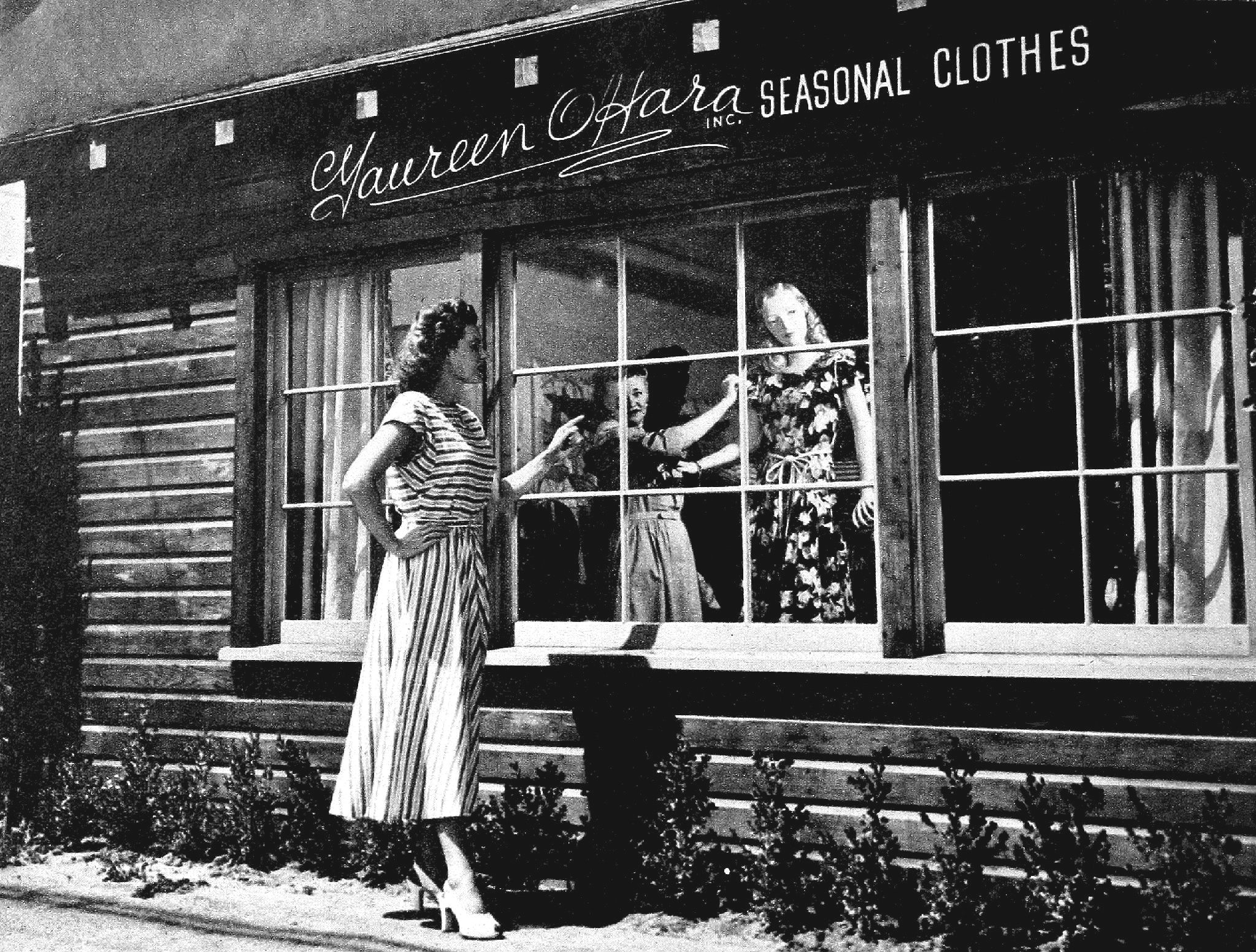
O'Hara's boutique in Tarzana, Los Angeles in 1947

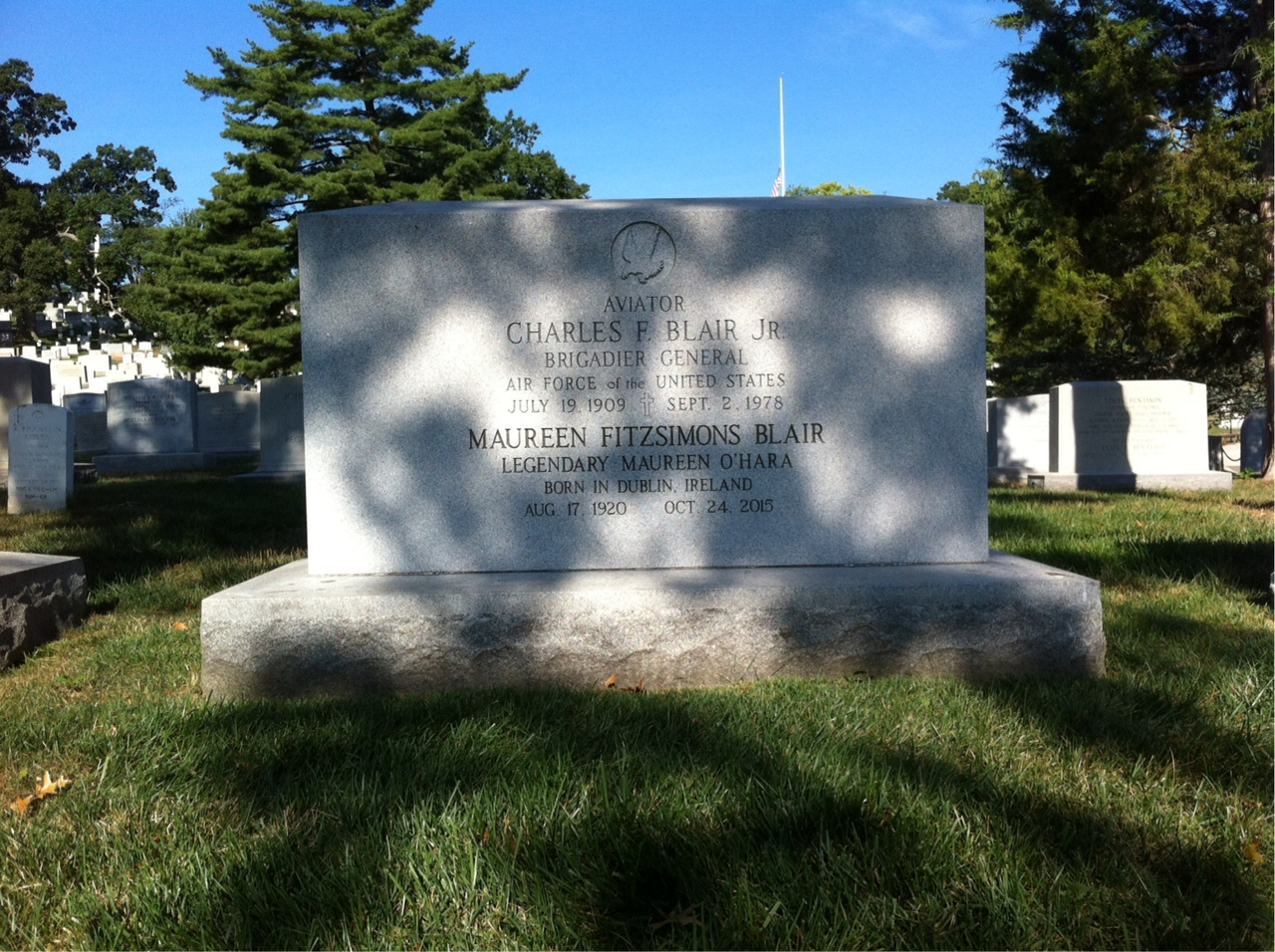
Grave at Arlington National Cemetery

In 1976, Blair had bought O'Hara a travel magazine, the Virgin Islander, which she began to edit from their home for 4 years in Saint Croix. She sold it in 1980 to USA Today to spend more time with her daughter and grandson Conor (born 1970). She passed on the airline business the following year, in 1981, which by this time was chartering 120 flights a day with a fleet of 27 planes. O'Hara had considerable prior experience in business, as from the 1940s she had run a clothing store, specializing in women's dresses, in Tarzana, Los Angeles. O'Hara increasingly spent time in Glengarriff on the south-west coast of Ireland, and established a golf tournament there in 1984 in the memory of her husband, Charles Blair. A hurricane in 1989 destroyed her home in Saint Croix. While in New York, inquiring about the costs of rebuilding, she suffered six successive heart attacks and underwent an angioplasty. She moved permanently to Glengarriff after suffering a stroke in 2005.

In May 2012, O'Hara's family contacted social workers regarding claims that O'Hara, who had short-term memory loss, was a victim of elder abuse. In September 2012, O'Hara flew to the United States after receiving doctor's permission to fly, and moved in with her grandson in Idaho. In her last years she suffered from type 2 diabetes and short-term memory loss.

On 24–25 May 2013, O'Hara made a public appearance at the 2013 John Wayne Birthday "Tribute to Maureen O'Hara" celebration in Winterset, Iowa. The occasion was groundbreaking for the new John Wayne Birthplace Museum; the festivities included an official proclamation from Iowa Governor Terry Branstad declaring 25 May 2013 as "Maureen O'Hara Day" in Iowa. The appearance included a performance by the Shannon Rovers Irish Pipe Band, who travelled from Chicago for the event.

On 24 October 2015, O'Hara died in her sleep at her home in Boise, Idaho, from natural causes, aged 95. She was buried at Arlington National Cemetery in Virginia, beside her late husband Charles Blair.

As a "staunch conservative Republican, O'Hara supported the presidential elections of Dwight D. Eisenhower, Richard Nixon, Gerald Ford, Ronald Reagan, George H. W. Bush and George W. Bush".

== Honours ==
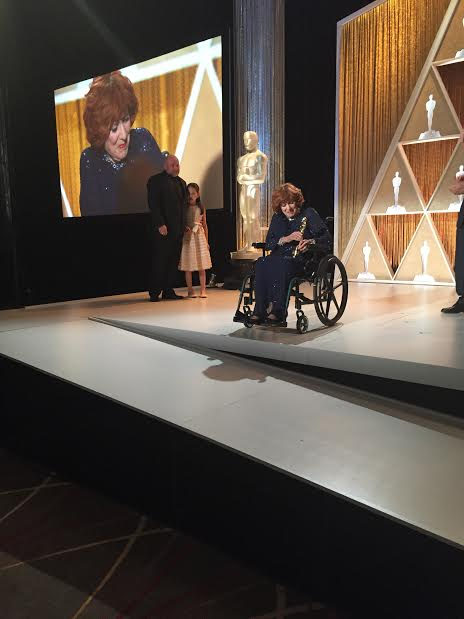
O'Hara receiving the Academy Honorary Award, 2014

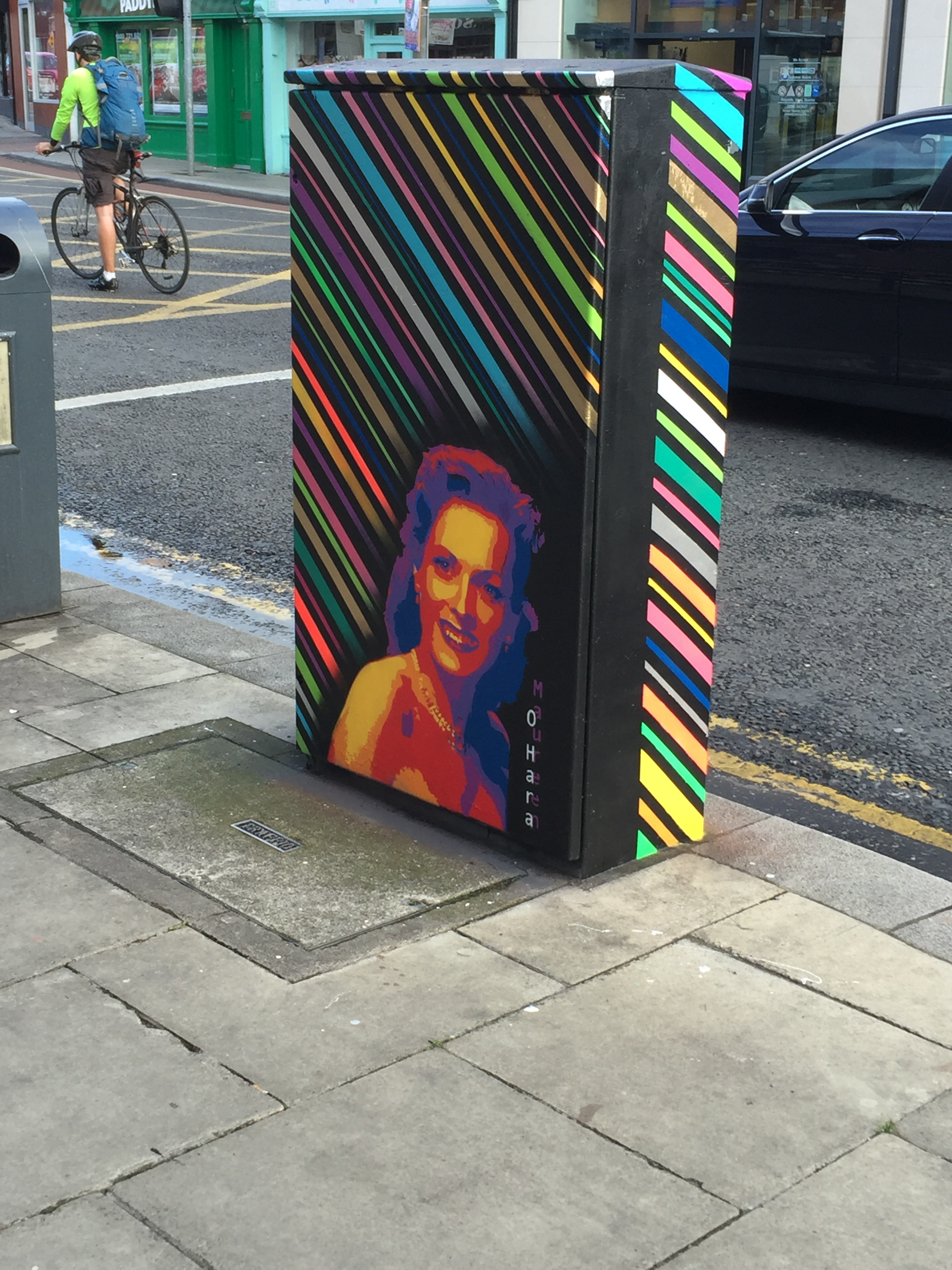
Maureen O'Hara themed street furniture in Ranelagh, Dublin, her native village

O'Hara was honoured on This Is Your Life, which was aired on 27 March 1957. In 1982, she was the first person to receive the American Ireland Fund Lifetime Achievement Award in Los Angeles. In 1988 she was awarded an honorary degree by the National University of Ireland, Galway. She further received the Heritage Award from the Ireland-American Fund in 1991.

In 1985 she was awarded the Career Achievement Award from the American Cinema Foundation. O'Hara also became the first woman to win the John F. Kennedy Memorial Award for "Outstanding American of Irish Descent for Service to God and Country". For her contributions to the motion picture industry, O'Hara has a star on the Hollywood Walk of Fame at 7004 Hollywood Blvd. In 1993, she was inducted into the Western Performers Hall of Fame at the National Cowboy & Western Heritage Museum in Oklahoma City, Oklahoma. She was awarded the Golden Boot Award.

In March 1999, O'Hara was selected to be grand marshal of New York City's St. Patrick's Day Parade. In 2004, she was honored with a Lifetime Achievement Award from the Irish Film and Television Academy in her native Dublin. The same year, O'Hara released her autobiography 'Tis Herself, co-authored with Johnny Nicoletti and published by Simon & Schuster. She wrote the foreword for the cookbook At Home in Ireland, and in 2007 she penned the foreword to the biography of her friend and film co-star, the late actress Anna Lee.

O'Hara was named Irish America's "Irish American of the Year" in 2005, with festivities held at the Plaza Hotel in New York. In 2006, O'Hara attended the Grand Reopening and Expansion of the Flying Boats Museum in Foynes, County Limerick as a patron of the museum. A significant portion of the museum is dedicated to her late husband, Charles. O'Hara donated her late husband's seaplane, the Excambian (a Sikorsky VS-44A), to the New England Air Museum. The restoration of the plane took eight years, and time was donated by former pilots and mechanics in honour of Charles Blair. It is the only surviving example of this type of early trans-Atlantic plane.

In 2011, O'Hara was formally inducted into the Irish America Hall of Fame at an event in New Ross, County Wexford. She was also named the president of the Universal Film & Festival Organization (UFFO), which promotes a code of conduct for film festivals and the film industry.

In 2012, O'Hara received the Freedom of the Town of Kells, County Meath, Ireland, her father's home, and a sculpture in her honour was unveiled.

In 2014, the Academy of Motion Picture Arts and Sciences selected O'Hara to receive the Academy Honorary Award, which was presented at the annual Governor's Awards in November that year. O'Hara became only the second actress, after Myrna Loy in 1991, to receive an Honorary Oscar without having previously been nominated for an Oscar in a competitive category.

== See also ==
- List of Academy Award winners and nominees from Ireland
