= Shannon Rovers Irish Pipe Band =

Pipe band located in Chicago, Illinois

- Established: 1926
- Location: Chicago, Illinois
- Tartan: Kennedy Modern
- Website: http://www.shannonrovers.com/

The Shannon Rovers are a pipe band based in Chicago, Illinois. The band plays traditional Irish music almost exclusively. The origins of many of the tunes are lost in antiquity. Centuries ago words were added to many of the melodies and these words provided the names of the tunes as we know them today. The band's signature set, 'Garryowen', 'O'Donnell Abu', and the 'Wearing of the Green' are ancient Irish melodies with words that were composed in the 1700 and 1800s, some of which chronicle events in the 17th century. More recently Garryowen was made famous in this country by Thomas Francis Meagher's Irish Brigade in the Civil War and later by George Custer's Seventh Cavalry.

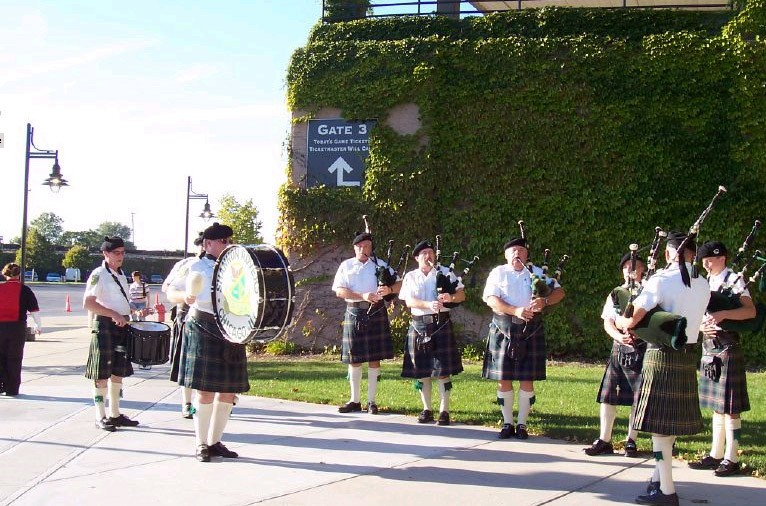
The Shannon Rovers in performance.

== History ==
=== 1926–1932: Formation and early years ===
The Shannon Rovers were first organized in 1926 by Tommie Ryan and a group of Irishmen, most of whom emigrated from Ireland in the 1920s, an historical period in Ireland. This was a period that included the occupation by the 'Black and Tans', the assassination of Michael Collins, the formation of the Irish free state, and the subsequent civil war in Ireland. They arrived in the United States in time to experience the Great Depression, as reflected in the minutes of a meeting held in 1930, which states that "the Shannon Rovers Club was organized for the promotion of Irish music and to help members who are in distress to run dances and social affairs to finance these objectives".

When the Shannon Rovers were first organized, they went by the name of the Shannon Rovers Fife and Drum Corps. In 1926, they first stepped off to lead a great parade at the newly opened Gaelic Park on 47th street. For the first six years, their fife and drum music was heard at every Irish gathering in the city. They attracted new members and became one of the most popular marching bands in the midwest. One of the highlights of the early years was a 1928 performance for the Democratic Party presidential nominee, Alfred E. Smith.

=== 1933–2000: Performing in Chicago and around the world ===
In 1932, the band switched to bagpipes, which are referred to in Ireland as the warpipes. Since the warpipes stirred up the Irish in battle, they were legally defined as an instrument of war under British law, and to play the pipes during the time of the Penal Laws was a capital offense. Since its founding, the Shannon Rovers have performed in thousands of local, national and international events.

Several high points during the band's history include an appearance at the 1933 World's Fair, and the opportunity to play for Pope John Paul II during his first visit to Chicago. The Rovers have also played for many of the U.S. Presidents starting with Franklin D. Roosevelt.

In 1952, the Shannon Rovers organized the first West Side Parade. It assembled in Garfield Park and marched on Madison Street from Hamlin Avenue to Laramie. It was the beginning of an annual tribute to St. Patrick that would eventually include participants from every community in the city. Today it is recognized as one of the greatest parades in the country.

The band's first "annual" trip to Ireland was made in 1932 - aboard the SS Columbus, followed by a second visit in 1968. In 1982, the Rovers competed for the first time in Ireland's Fleadh Cheoil, then held in Listowel County Kerry. The band placed first. They returned to the competition in 1994. This time it was held in Clonmel, County Tipperary and the band took 3rd place. In 1996, the band returned to the Fleadh Cheoil, which was again held in Listowel, County Kerry and played to a second-place finish. The Fleadh Cheoil is organized by the Comhaltas Ceoltóirí Éireann and is held annually. It is a world class event with Celtic bands and musicians coming from all over the world to compete in traditional Irish music. For a group to compete in Ireland it must qualify by placing first, second, or third in its home country.

One of the Shannon Rovers' traditions has been leading Chicago's St. Patrick's Day Parade. Beginning with the crowning of the St. Patrick's Day Queen in February through the month of March, the Rovers play over 125 events. However, nothing compares to stepping off to lead the Parade. Chicago has carried on the tradition since the first annual St. Patrick's Day parade on State Street in 1956. The Shannon Rovers Irish Pipe Band have stepped off every parade since then.

In 1980, the Shannon Rovers visited Australia to lead Sydney's St. Patrick's Day Parade and returned to Chicago in time to lead Chicago's Parade - two St. Patrick's Day Parades in opposite corners of the world within a 24-hour period.

=== 2001–present: Continuing the tradition ===
One of the more emotional Chicago St. Patrick's Day parade was a memorial, in 2002, to the September 11, 2001 attacks on the World Trade Center. The parade was dedicated to Father Mychal F. Judge, Chaplain of the New York Fire Department and the thousands others who lost their lives in the attack. The parade was attended by President George W. Bush.

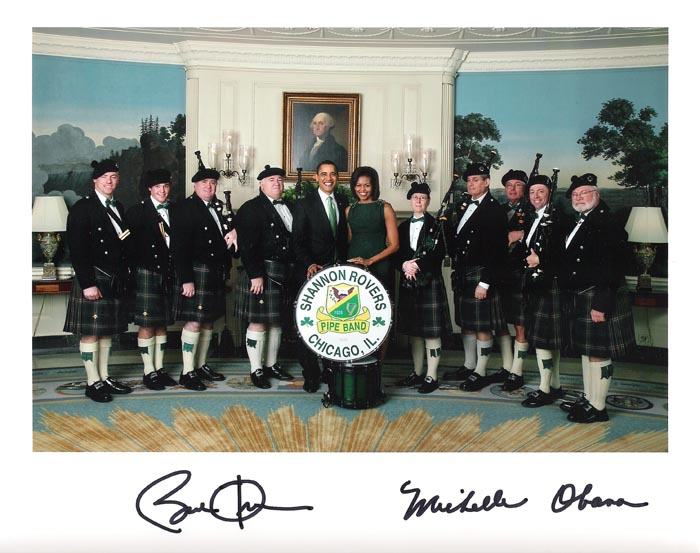
The Shannon Rovers with President Barack Obama and First Lady Michelle Obama.

On March 17, 2009, six bagpipers and three drummers from the Shannon Rovers were invited to play at the White House for a St. Patrick's Day celebration.

Today, the band is made up of seventy plus pipers, drummers and color guard. On March 1, 2014, the band played the Chicago Blackhawks and the Pittsburgh Penguins onto the ice at the 2014 NHL Stadium Series in Chicago. In November 2015, the band was requested to play at the funeral and burial of the Irish actress Maureen O'Hara. 50 members of the band traveled to Washington, D.C. for the burial at Arlington National Cemetery.
