= Avenarius =

Avenarius (translated from German: Haber, Habermann) may refer to:

- Ferdinand Avenarius (1856–1923), a German poet
- Georgy Avenarius (1903–1958), one of the founders of Soviet film criticism
- Johannes Avenarius or Johann Habermann (1516–1590), a theologian
- Richard Avenarius (1843–1896), a philosopher
- Vasily Avenarius (1839–1923), a writer and memoirist
