= Peter Viertel =

German author

- Born: 16 November 1920; Dresden, Germany
- Died: 4 November 2007 (aged 86); Marbella, Spain
- Spouses: Virginia Lee Ray (m. 1943; div. 1958) Deborah Kerr (m. 1960; died 2007)
- Parent(s): Berthold Viertel; Salka Viertel

Peter Viertel (16 November 1920 – 4 November 2007) was an American author and screenwriter.

== Biography ==
Viertel was born to Jewish parents in Dresden, Germany, the writer and actress Salka Viertel and the writer Berthold Viertel. In 1928, his parents moved to Santa Monica, California, where Viertel grew up with his brothers, Hans and Thomas. The home in Santa Monica Canyon was the site of salons and meetings of the Hollywood intelligentsia and the émigré community of European intellectuals, particularly at the Sunday night tea parties given by Viertel's mother. However, Viertel identified more with Southern California youth culture than with the European milieu he was exposed to by his family. "The physical aspect of European intellectuals was so totally different from what an American kid wants to be," he told the International Herald Tribune in 1992. "I knew Bert Brecht was close to being a genius, but he was a funny-looking man to me."

Viertel graduated from Dartmouth College in 1941. He enlisted in the United States Marine Corps as a private, but after being assigned office work in California (in his memoirs he joked he was a "Remington Raider" in reference to the typewriters they used), he applied for officer training and eventually was accepted by the OSS, the predecessor of the CIA, where his recruiters were impressed that he had already published at 19 the highly acclaimed novel The Canyon (1940), and had written a screenplay for Alfred Hitchcock, Saboteur (1942), as well as the script for The Hard Way (1943). His obvious high intelligence, native German language skills, good looks and athleticism were useful in Nazi-controlled Europe. He finished the war as a second lieutenant where he served with the Seventh United States Army in Southern France where he recruited several female agents.

Based on his experiences, Viertel wrote the play The Survivors with his friend Irwin Shaw. It premiered in New York City in 1948, and was turned into an episode for the US Studio One TV series in 1950, and a BBC television movie in 1957. Some of his war experiences found their way into the screenplay for Anatole Litvak's highly acclaimed movie Decision Before Dawn (1951). He found it difficult to turn his OSS experiences into a novel and struggled with it for several decades, and a draft was found after his death, but as of 2018 there has been no news of potential publication, nor of the second volume of his autobiography.

Viertel was best known for his novel White Hunter Black Heart, which was made into a film starring Clint Eastwood in 1990. It is a thinly-disguised account of Viertel's experiences working with film director John Huston while they were making The African Queen. The central character is scriptwriter Pete Verrill while the Huston character is called John Wilson. Film critic Pauline Kael wrote in 1999 that White Hunter was “still the best Hollywood novel I’ve ever come across — and it isn’t even set in Hollywood.” Viertel's opinion of the finished film was tempered by his idea that Huston himself would have preferred a portrayal with more sarcasm. Viertel's looks and personality were an inspiration for Robert Redford's character Hubbell Gardiner in The Way We Were.

Of his screenwriting work for Hollywood productions, Viertel said that it was primarily a vehicle for income so that he could continue to write novels. Though he worked closely with movie professionals that he liked such as Billy Wilder and Huston, Viertel said there was always creative tension.

Viertel is recognized for introducing surfing in Europe. In 1956, while on location in Biarritz for the filming of The Sun Also Rises, Viertel was so impressed by the waves that he sent for his surfboard from California and soon afterwards started Europe's first surf club.

Viertel was twice married. His first wife was Virginia Ray "Jigee" Schulberg, the ex-wife of the novelist and screenwriter Budd Schulberg; she was pregnant with their only child, Christine, when Viertel abandoned her to live with the fashion model Simone Micheline "Bettina" Bodin. Varying sources show that Viertel and Jigee divorced in 1958, 1959, or were still separated but legally married upon her death in January 1960. Bettina left him for Prince Aly Khan in 1955, and was pregnant with Khan's child when he died in May 1960. Viertel's second wife was the actress Deborah Kerr, marrying her on 23 July 1960. Viertel was widowed by Kerr on 16 October 2007, just 19 days before he died from lymphoma while living in Marbella, Spain; he was 12 days shy of his 87th birthday. Through Kerr he had two stepdaughters, Melanie and Francesca Bartley.

A filmed documentary by director Michael Scheingraber was in production at the time of Viertel's death. Titled Peter Viertel – Between the Lines, the film is based upon over 400 minutes of recorded interviews with him.

== Films ==
- Saboteur (1942)
- The Hard Way (1943)
- The Search (Draft – uncredited) (1948)
- We Were Strangers (1949)
- Roughshod (Story) (1949)
- The Survivors (Studio One TV series episode) (Story) (1950)
- Decision Before Dawn (1951)
- The African Queen (Uncredited) (1951)
- Beat the Devil (Screenplay collaboration – uncredited) 1953
- The Village (1953)
- The Hard Way (Lux Video Theatre TV series episode) 1957
- The Survivors (TV movie) (with Irwin Shaw) 1957
- The Sun Also Rises (1957)
- The Night Heaven Fell (Uncredited) (1958)
- The Old Man and the Sea (1958)
- Five Miles to Midnight (1962)
- White Hunter Black Heart (1990)

== Books ==
- The Canyon (1940)
- Line of Departure (1947)
- White Hunter Black Heart (1953)
- Love Lies Bleeding (1964)
- Bicycle on the Beach (1971)
- American Skin (1984)
- Dangerous Friends: At Large with Huston and Hemingway in the Fifties (1992)
- Loser Deals (1995)

== Play ==
The Survivors, (with Irwin Shaw) New York, Playhouse Theatre, January 1948.
