= John G. Hanna =

American engineer

John Griffin Hanna (1889–1948) was an American sailboat designer, famous for designing the Tahiti ketch.

Hanna was born in Galveston, Texas, on October 12, 1889. During his childhood he was afflicted with deafness following scarlet fever and lost a foot in a traffic accident. Around 1917, he settled in Dunedin, Florida, and was greatly influenced by the Greek double-ended sponge boats found in nearby Tarpon Springs, Florida. Shortly after his move to Dunedin, Hanna purchased a double-ended ketch-rigged sponge boat that had been built in Apalachicola, Florida by a Greek-American shipwright named Demo George. This vessel, and others that Hanna studied, would inspire the design of Hanna's famous Tahiti ketch. Hanna died in 1948.

Hanna originally wrote of his Tahiti ketch as a 30-foot (9.1 m) deep-sea auxiliary cruiser. The design is described and illustrated in detail in the 1935 new edition of How to build 20 boats, pp. 118–133.

Hanna designed a 70-foot (21 m) research vessel, Iorano, for amphibian tractor inventor Donald Roebling, which was constructed on Roebling's own property, and which took part in a Smithsonian-connected scientific expedition led by Paul Bartsch in 1937. His 1926 Story-built ketch Faith was later purchased by director John Ford and renamed Araner. Ford, a naval reservist, used the boat both for personal recreation and for naval intelligence. The boat was later taken into U.S. Navy service directly as USS Araner (IX-57) during World War II.

At least two boats of Hanna's design have circumnavigated the world twice: Jean Gau in the Atom; and Tom Steele in the Adios.

Hanna was a gifted small vessel designer, but perhaps his greatest strength -and weakness- was as a writer and critic of other's designs. He was let go by the Rudder after a drawn-out feud with L. Francis Herreshoff, who was also a columnist there, and debated acerbically with Thomas C. Gillmer over Tahiti's design antecedents, as well as with Philip Rhodes, and Howard Chapelle.
