= Habermann =

Habermann is a German surname. Notable people with the surname include:

- Eugen Habermann (1884–1944), Estonian architect
- Eva Habermann (born 1976), German actress
- Franz Johann Habermann (1706–1783), Czech composer and musician
- Johann Habermann (1516–1590), German Lutheran theologian
- Nico Habermann (1932–1993), Dutch-American computer scientist
- Sven Habermann (born 1961), German-Canadian soccer player

== See also ==
- Habermann (film), a 2010 German-Czech film
