= USS Araner (IX-57) =

History

United States
- Namesake: Aran Islands
- Builder: Arthur D. Story Shipyards
- Laid down: 1926
- Acquired: 27 January 1942
- In service: 26 February 1942
- Stricken: 14 October 1944
- Fate: Unknown

General characteristics
- Displacement: 147 Tons
- Length: 106 ft 5 in (32.44 m)
- Beam: 25 ft 2 in (7.67 m)
- Draft: 10 ft 6 in (3.20 m)
- Speed: 8 knots

USS Araner was a wooden-hulled auxiliary ketch, designed by Jack Hanna, built in 1926 at Essex, Massachusetts by the Arthur D. Story Shipyards, and acquired by motion picture director John Ford in June 1934. Originally named Faith, she was refurbished and renamed Araner in honor of the Aran Islands, whence Ford's family had come.

During the 1930s, the yacht served as a place where Ford could escape the bustle of Hollywood in the company of friends, including John Wayne, Ward Bond, Maureen O'Hara, Preston Foster and Wingate Smith. Ford kept the yacht moored at Santa Catalina Island. During the winter months, Ford would take the yacht down to Mexico with his male friends including Wayne and Bond.

The film director was appointed a Lieutenant Commander in the United States Navy Reserve in September 1934 and, according to one of his biographers, used Araner off Baja California for intelligence-gathering operations. In 1940, the commandant of the 11th Naval District commended Ford for his "... initiative in securing valuable information..." on that region.

After he was recalled to active duty in the summer of 1941, Ford had little use for his yacht. Shortly thereafter, America's entry into World War II in December 1941 prompted the United States Navy to acquire many private vessels and Araner was among them, for local patrol duties. Taken over on a bareboat charter on 27 January 1942, Araner was delivered to the Navy at the section base at San Diego, California. Classified as a miscellaneous auxiliary and given the designation IX-57, she was placed in service on 26 February 1942. Assigned initially to the 11th Naval District and then, on 23 July 1942, to the Western Sea Frontier, the ketch operated out of San Diego, under sail power for much of the time, patrolling off Guadalupe and San Clemente Islands.

Transferred back to the 11th Naval District forces upon completion of her duties under the Commander, Western Sea Frontier, Araner was laid up at the Naval Frontier Base San Diego on 1 May 1944; and her crew transferred to YAG-6. Delivered to Mrs. John Ford on 12 July 1944, Araner was struck from the Naval Vessel Register on 14 October 1944.

Ford continued to use the yacht until her rising operating expenses prompted him to sell her circa 1971. Acquired by Fran M. Dimond, of Honolulu, the craft retained her name into 1974, when she was bought by the San Marino Travel Service. Still homeported at Honolulu, she was given back her original name, Faith in, or about, 1975. Renamed again, to Windjammer, a short time later, she was acquired by the Guam Rent-a-Car Company and served as a tourist-carrying craft into the early 1980s. She resumed the name Araner in 1988, still homeported at Honolulu.

She sank in the Mactan Channel near Cebu, Philippines during a typhoon in 1999.

== Sources ==
- Malone, Aubrey (12 September 2013). Maureen O'Hara: The Biography. University Press of Kentucky. ISBN 978-0-8131-4240-1.
- Nollen, Scott Allen (22 March 2013). Three Bad Men: John Ford, John Wayne, Ward Bond. McFarland. ISBN 978-0-7864-5854-7.
- Roberts, Randy (1997). John Wayne: American. U of Nebraska Press. ISBN 0-8032-8970-7.
