= Sparring with Hemingway =

1995 nonfiction book by Budd Schulberg

Sparring with Hemingway is a 1995 book written by Budd Schulberg consisting of a collection of his articles spanning nearly half a century. The book includes descriptions of fights between Rocky Marciano and Archie Moore; Muhammad Ali and George Foreman; Sugar Ray Leonard and Roberto Durán; and Marvelous Marvin Hagler and Thomas Hearns.

== Reception ==
A review of the book in The New York Times praises Schulberg's technical expertise on the subject of boxing. A Chicago Tribune review of the book states:

The pieces in the present volume range over the whole of Schulberg's career and include those drawn from his days as a reporter for the New York Post as well as assignments for Sports Illustrated and other publications. He chronicles the demise of Archie Moore, the implacable assaults of Rocky Marciano, the supernova-like appearance of Cassius Clay and his psych job on the theretofore-invincible Sonny Liston, the saga of Mike Tyson (predicting long before Tyson's conviction on rape charges that "the biggest fight of all may still be Tyson vs. Tyson") and the resurrection of George Foreman: "Win or lose, this 260 pounds of fighting preacher has proved what . . . F. Scott Fitzgerald denied when he wrote, `There are no second acts in American lives.' "
