= Jigee Viertel =

American actress

- Born: Virginia Lee Ray; September 30, 1915; Pittsburgh, Pennsylvania, U.S.
- Died: January 31, 1960 (aged 44); Los Angeles, California, U.S.
- Occupation: actress
- Spouses: Budd Schulberg (m. 1936; div. 1942) Peter Viertel (m. 1943; div. 1959)
- Children: 2

Jigee Viertel (born Virginia Lee Ray; September 30, 1915 – January 31, 1960) was an actress in early Hollywood pictures and later the wife of screenwriters Budd Schulberg and Peter Viertel. She was active in early Hollywood socialist organizing and later in life was linked to the writers Ring Lardner, Jr. and Ernest Hemingway. She died from burns she suffered after inadvertently dropping a lit cigarette into the pocket of her flammable sleepwear.

== Biography ==
Born Virginia Lee Ray in Pittsburgh, Pennsylvania. Her younger sister, Anne (later married to Melvin Frank), originally pronounced Virginia as Jigee. The family moved to Los Angeles, where Jigee became active in dance and theater and is credited with appearances in three early motion pictures: One in a Million (1936), Bottoms Up (1934) and Three Kids and a Queen (1935).

She married Budd Schulberg on New Year's Eve 1936. They had one child, daughter Victoria, then divorced in 1943. She married Peter Viertel in 1943, and was pregnant with their daughter Christine when Peter left her to live with fashion model Bettina Graziani; they did not divorce until 1959. Reputedly dependent on alcohol and sleeping medication, Viertel woke one night in her Los Angeles home and while in the bathroom lit a cigarette that she then dropped inadvertently into the pocket of her dressing gown, causing her immolation. She died a month later on January 31, 1960, from the burns she suffered.
