= Budd Schulberg =

American writer (1914–2009)

- Schulberg in 1967
- Born: Seymour Wilson Schulberg; March 27, 1914; New York City, U.S.
- Died: August 5, 2009 (aged 95); Westhampton Beach, New York, U.S.
- Occupations: Film writer; sports writer; novelist
- Spouses: Virginia Lee Ray (m. 1936; div. 1942) Agnes Victoria Anderson (m. 1943; div. 1964) Geraldine Brooks (m. 1964; died 1977) Betsy Ann Langman (m. 1978)
- Children: 5
- Parent(s): B. P. Schulberg; Adeline Jaffe
- Relatives: Sam Jaffe (uncle)
- Writing career
- Period: 1937–1982

Budd Schulberg (born Seymour Wilson Schulberg; March 27, 1914 – August 5, 2009) was an American screenwriter, television producer, novelist and sports writer. He was known for his novels What Makes Sammy Run? (1941) and The Harder They Fall (1947), as well as his screenplays for On the Waterfront (1954) and A Face in the Crowd (1957), receiving an Academy Award for the former.

== Early life and education ==
Schulberg was raised in a Jewish family the son of Hollywood film-producer B. P. Schulberg and Adeline (née Jaffe) Schulberg, who founded a talent agency taken over by her brother, agent/film producer Sam Jaffe. In 1931, when Schulberg was 17, his father left the family to live with actress Sylvia Sidney. His parents divorced in 1933.

Schulberg attended Deerfield Academy and then went on to Dartmouth College, where he was actively involved in the Dartmouth Jack-O-Lantern humor magazine and was a member of the Pi Lambda Phi fraternity. In 1939, he collaborated on the screenplay for Winter Carnival, a light comedy set at Dartmouth. One of his collaborators was F. Scott Fitzgerald, who was fired because of his alcoholic binge during a visit with Schulberg to Dartmouth. Dartmouth College awarded Schulberg an honorary degree in 1960.

== World War II ==
While serving in the Navy during World War II, Schulberg was assigned to the Office of Strategic Services (OSS), working with John Ford's documentary unit, the Field Photographic Branch. Following VE Day, he witnessed the liberation of Nazi concentration camps. He was involved in gathering evidence against war criminals for the Nuremberg Trials, an assignment that included arresting propaganda film maker Leni Riefenstahl at her chalet in Kitzbühel, Austria, ostensibly to have her identify the faces of Nazi war criminals in German film footage captured by the Allied troops. Riefenstahl claimed she was not aware of the nature of the concentration camps. According to Schulberg, "She gave me the usual song and dance. She said: 'Of course, you know, I'm really so misunderstood. I'm not political.'"

Georgy Avenarius, a film critic before the war and the Soviet major in charge of UFA GmbH Babelsberg Studio in Soviet Berlin, allowed the Field Photo team access to the Nazi newsreels and propaganda films in his custody upon learning that his admired Ford was the branch head.

Budd, his brother Stuart Schulberg and the team at Field Photo presented two films during the trial: Nazi Concentration Camps, from Allied films shot during the liberation of the camps, and The Nazi Plan, from German sources.

== Career ==
Being the son of a successful Hollywood producer gave Schulberg an insider's viewpoint on the true happenings of Hollywood, which was reflected in much of his writing.

His 1941 novel What Makes Sammy Run? allowed the public to see the harshness of Hollywood stardom via Sammy Glick's rise to power in a major Hollywood film studio. This novel was criticized by some as being self-directed anti-semitism. Then a member of the Communist Party USA, Schulberg quit in protest after he was ordered by high-ranking Party member John Howard Lawson to make changes to the novel. Schulburg has said that the Sammy Glick character was a "composite" based partly on producer Jerry Wald and Milton Sperling, who was Harry Warner's son-in-law.

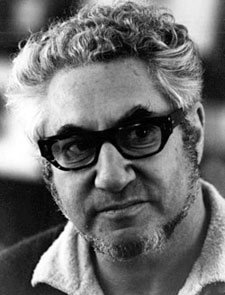
Schulberg in 1954

In 1950, Schulberg published The Disenchanted, about a young screenwriter who collaborates on a screenplay about a college winter festival with a famous novelist at the nadir of his career. The novelist (who was then assumed by reviewers to be a thinly disguised portrait of Fitzgerald, who had died 10 years earlier) is portrayed as a tragic, flawed figure, with whom the young screenwriter becomes disillusioned. The novel was the tenth bestselling novel in the United States in 1950 and was adapted as a Broadway play in 1958, starring Jason Robards (who won a Tony Award for his performance) and George Grizzard as the character loosely based on Schulberg. In 1958, Schulberg wrote and co-produced (with his younger brother Stuart) the film Wind Across the Everglades, directed by Nicholas Ray.

Schulberg wrote the 1957 film A Face in the Crowd. Based on the short story "Your Arkansas Traveler" in his book Some Faces in the Crowd, the film starred newcomer Andy Griffith as an obscure country singer who rises to fame and becomes extraordinarily manipulative to preserve his success and power.

He encountered political controversy in 1951 when screenwriter Richard Collins, testifying to the House Un-American Activities Committee (HUAC), named Schulberg as a former member of the Communist Party. Schulberg, still resentful of the influence Communist officials tried to exert over his fiction, testified as a friendly witness and explained how Communist Party members had sought to influence the content of What Makes Sammy Run? and "named names" of other Hollywood communists.

Schulberg was also a sports writer and former chief boxing correspondent for Sports Illustrated. He wrote some well-received books on boxing, including Sparring with Hemingway. He was inducted into the International Boxing Hall of Fame in 2002 in recognition of his contributions to the sport.

He wrote a script for a film adaptation of Bobby Kennedy's book The Enemy Within, with Jerry Wald set to produce the film for Twentieth Century Fox. However the studio backed out over fears that truckers from the Teamsters union would refuse to transport the film tape to the theaters. The book exposed criminality by Jimmy Hoffa and others in the Teamsters hierarchy.

In 1965, after a devastating riot had ripped apart the fabric of the Watts section of Los Angeles, Schulberg formed the Watts Writers Workshop in an attempt to ease frustrations and bring artistic training to the economically impoverished district.

Schulberg penned the introduction to Walter Sheridan's 1972 book The Fall and Rise of Jimmy Hoffa. In 1981, Schulberg wrote Moving Pictures: Memories of a Hollywood Prince, an autobiography covering his youth in Hollywood growing up in the 1920s and 1930s among the famous motion picture actors and producers as the son of B. P. Schulberg, head of Paramount Studios.

== Personal life and death ==
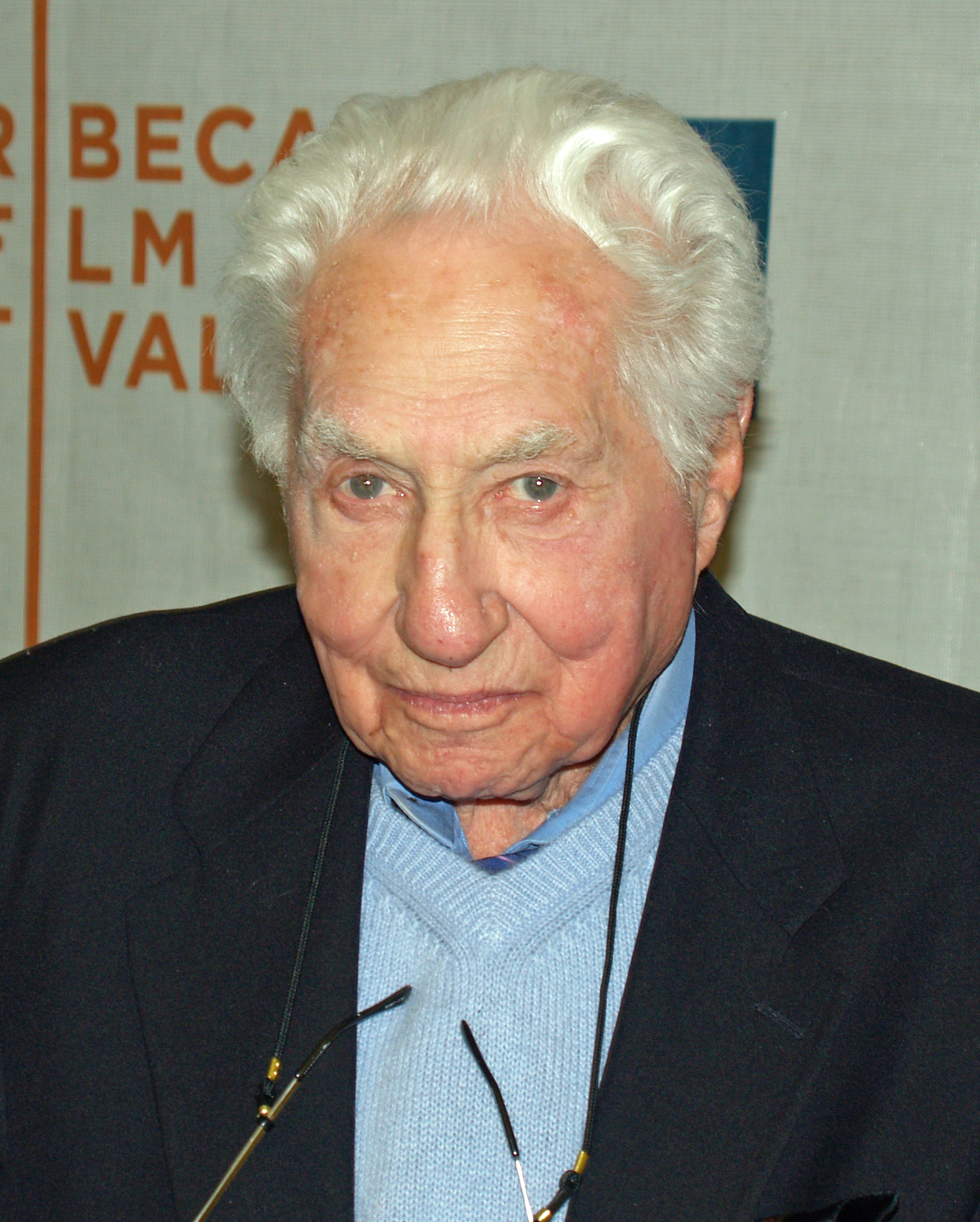
Schulberg at the 2007 Tribeca Film Festival

Schulberg was married four times. In 1936, he married his first wife, actress Virginia "Jigee" Lee Ray. They had one daughter, Victoria, before divorcing in 1942. In 1943, he married Victoria "Vickee" Anderson. They divorced in 1964. They had two children: Stephen (born 1944) and David (born 1946). David was a Vietnam veteran who predeceased his father. In 1964, he married actress Geraldine Brooks. They were married until her death in 1977; they had no children. In 1977, he married Betsy Anne Langman, daughter of Anne W. Simon, stepdaughter of real estate developer Robert E. Simon, granddaughter of investment banker Maurice Wertheim and great-granddaughter of US ambassador Henry Morgenthau Sr.; they had two children: Benn and Jessica.

His niece Sandra Schulberg was an executive producer of the Academy Award-nominated film Quills. His mother, of the Ad Schulberg Agency, served as his agent until her death in 1977. His brother, Stuart Schulberg, was a movie and television producer (David Brinkley's Journal, The Today Show). His sister, Sonya Schulberg (O'Sullivan) (1918–2016), was an occasional writer (of a novel, They Cried a Little, and stories).

Budd Schulberg died in his home in Westhampton Beach, New York, on August 5, 2009, at the age of 95.

== Bibliography ==
- What Makes Sammy Run? (1941)
- The Harder They Fall (1947)
- The Disenchanted (1950)
- Some Faces in the Crowd (1952)
- Schulberg, Budd (1953). "The breaking point". In Birmingham, Frederic A. (ed.). The girls from Esquire. London: Arthur Barker. pp. 114–120.
- On the Waterfront (1954)
- Introduction to Sheridan, Walter (1972). The Fall and Rise of Jimmy Hoffa. Saturday Review Press.
- Moving Pictures: Memories of a Hollywood Prince (1981)
- Sparring with Hemingway (1995)

== Select film and television credits ==
- A Star Is Born (1937) - uncredited writer
- Nothing Sacred (1937) - uncredited writer
- Cinco fueron escogidos (1943), about war in Yugoslavia
- On the Waterfront (1954) - story, script
- The Harder They Fall (1956) - based on his novel
- A Face in the Crowd (1957) - story, script
- Wind Across the Everglades (1958) - script, producer, uncredited director

== See also ==
- The Nazi Plan
