= Nazi Concentration Camps (film) =

1945 film made by the U.S. Army

- Directed by: George Stevens
- Produced by: John Ford
- Release date: 1945
- Running time: 59 minutes

Nazi Concentration Camps, also known as Nazi Concentration and Prison Camps, (Note: Some prints of the film use a title card that reads Nazi Concentration and Prison Camps. However, Nuremberg trial transcripts and the U.S. National Archives and Records Administration use the title Nazi Concentration Camps.) is a 1945 American film that documents the liberation of Nazi concentration camps by Allied forces during World War II. It was produced by the United States from footage captured by military photographers serving in the Allied armies as they advanced into Nazi Germany. The film was presented as evidence of Nazi war crimes in the Nuremberg trials in 1945, and the Adolf Eichmann trial in 1961.

In 1944, General Dwight D. Eisenhower requested that film director George Stevens organize a team of photographers and cameramen to capture the Normandy landings and the North African campaign. The group of forty-five people assembled was dubbed the Special Coverage Unit (SPECOU), or "Stevens Irregulars" informally. The use of the footage as evidence in a war crime trial was not initially contemplated; however, on 25 April 1945, the Supreme Headquarters of the Allied Expeditionary Forces (SHAEF) issued a memo directing cameramen in the United States Army Signal Corps to take complete still and motion pictures of the camps. The memo suggested the potential use of this footage as evidence for the Judge Advocate General War Crimes Commission.

The film was presented in the courtroom on 29 November 1945 and entered as evidence in the trial. It includes extremely graphic scenes and shocked both the defendants and the judges, who adjourned the trial. The film, approximately one hour in length and spread over six reels, comprises 6,000 feet of the 80,000 feet of film shot by both American and British cameramen. The film contains footage from the liberation of twelve camps in Austria, Belgium, and Nazi Germany: Leipzig, Penig, Ohrdruf, Hadamar, Breendonk, Hannover, Arnstadt, Nordhausen, Mauthausen, Buchenwald, Dachau, and Belsen.

== Contents ==
The contents of the films as described by the U.S. National Archives and Records Administration (NARA) and documented in catalog entry 43452 (public domain material):

=== Reel 1 ===
Army Lt. Col. George C. Stevens, Navy Lt. E. Ray Kellogg and U.S. Chief of Counsel Robert H. Jackson read exhibited affidavits which attest to authenticity of scenes in film. A map of Europe shows locations of concentration camps in Austria, Belgium, Bulgaria, Czechoslovakia, Danzig, Denmark, France, Nazi Germany, the Isle of Jersey, Latvia, the Netherlands, Poland and Yugoslavia. At Leipzig concentration camp, there are piles of dead bodies, and many living Russian, Czechoslovak, Polish and French prisoners. At Penig Concentration Camp, Hungarian women and others display wounds. Doctors treat patients and U.S. Red Cross workers move them to German Air Force hospital where their former captors are forced to care for them.

=== Reel 2 ===
At Ohrdruf concentration camp, inspection team composed of Allied military leaders, members of U.S. Congress and local townspeople tours camp. Among them are Generals Dwight Eisenhower, Supreme Headquarters Allied Expeditionary Force commander; Omar Bradley; and George S. Patton. General Eisenhower speaks with Congressmen. They see bodies heaped on grill at crematorium and Polish, Czechoslovak, Russian, Belgian, German Jews and German political prisoners. Col. Heyden Sears, Combat Command A, 4th Armored Division commander, forces local townspeople to tour camp. U.S. officers arrive at Hadamar, where Polish, Russian and German political and religious dissidents were murdered. Maj. Herman Boelke of U.S. War Crimes Investigation Team (WCIT) examines survivors. Bodies are exhumed from mass graves for examination, identification and burial. Four-man panel interviews facility director Dr. Waldman and chief male nurse Karl Wille.

=== Reel 3 ===
At Breendonck concentration camp in Belgium, methods of torture are demonstrated. At Harlan Concentration Camp near Hannover, U.S. Red Cross aides Polish survivors. Allied troops and able-bodied survivors bury dead. At Arnstadt Concentration Camp, German villagers are forced to exhume Polish and Russian bodies from mass graves.

=== Reel 4 ===
At Nordhausen concentration camp, there are piles of bodies. Troops treat, feed and remove survivors who are mainly Polish, Russian and French. At Mauthausen concentration camp, Navy Lt. Jack H. Taylor stands with fellow survivors and describes his capture, imprisonment and conditions at Mauthausen. Volunteers bathe victims.

=== Reel 5 ===
At Buchenwald, Army trucks arrive with aid for survivors. Piles of dead, mutilated and emaciated bodies. Some survivors among dead. Huge ovens and piles of bone ash on floor of crematorium. Civilians from nearby Weimar are forced to tour camp. They see exhibits of lampshades made of human skin, and two shrunken heads.

=== Reel 6 ===
British commander of Royal Artillery describes conditions at Bergen-Belsen. Schutzstaffel (SS) troops are forced to bury dead and aid survivors. A woman doctor and former prisoner describes conditions in the female section of camp. Belsen commander Kramer is taken into custody. German guards bury the dead. A bulldozer pushes piles of bodies into mass graves.

== Sources ==
- Priemel, Kim Christian (2016). The Betrayal: The Nuremberg Trials and German Divergence. Oxford University Press. ISBN 978-0-19-256374-3.
- Michalczyk, John J. (2014). Filming the End of the Holocaust. Bloomsbury Academic. ISBN 978-1-4725-1037-2.

== See also ==
- The Nazi Plan – 1945 film by George Stevens
