= John Ford =

American film director (1894–1973)

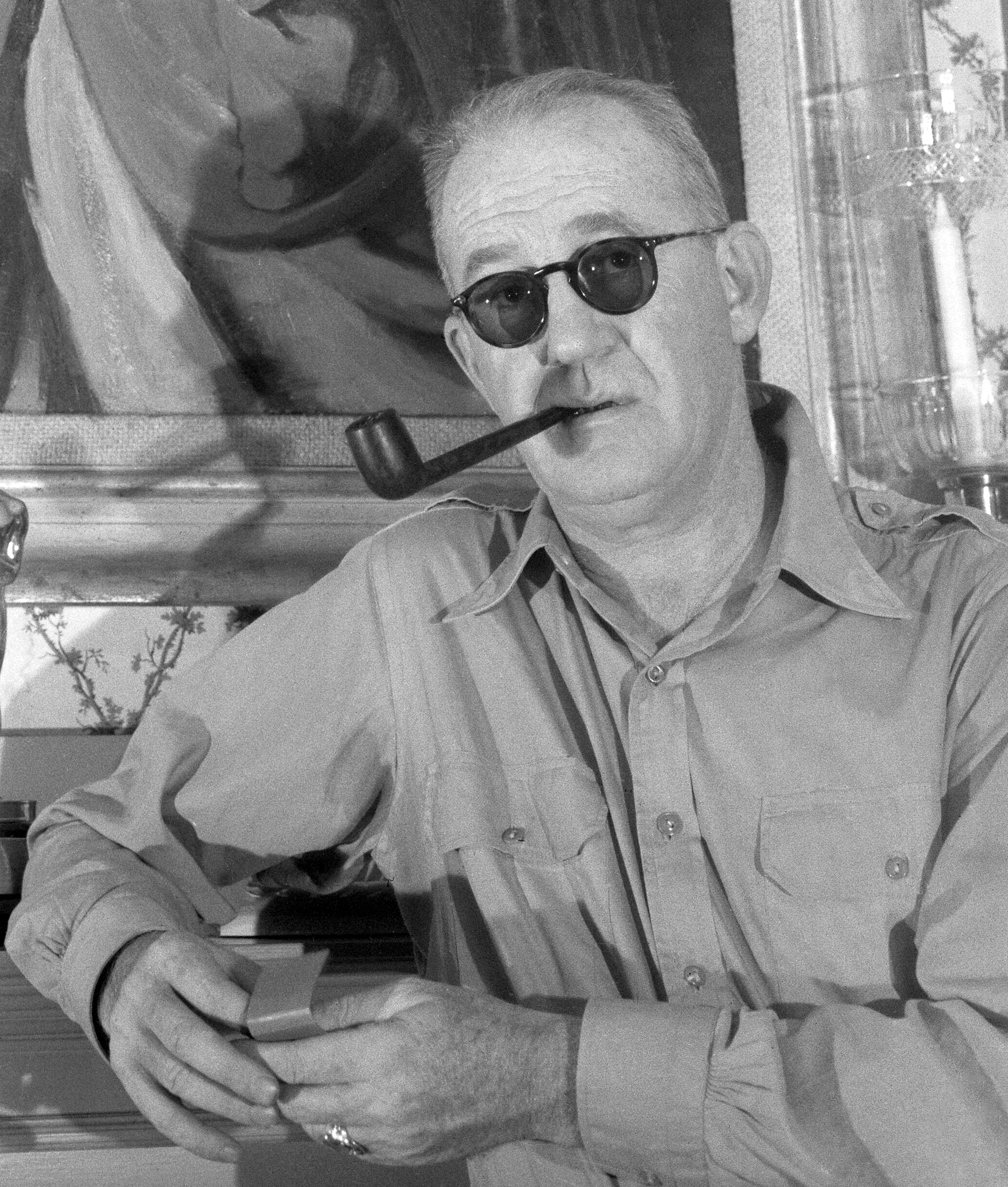
- Ford in 1946
- Born: John Martin Feeney; February 1, 1894; Cape Elizabeth, Maine, U.S.
- Died: August 31, 1973 (aged 79); Palm Desert, California, U.S.
- Resting place: Holy Cross Cemetery, Culver City, California
- Occupations: Film director; producer; US Navy rear admiral
- Years active: 1913–1966
- Spouse: Mary McBride Smith (m. 1920)
- Children: 2
- Relatives: Francis Ford (brother); Philip Ford (nephew)

John Martin Feeney (February 1, 1894 – August 31, 1973), better known as John Ford, was an American film director and producer. He is regarded as one of the most important and influential filmmakers during the Golden Age of Hollywood, and was one of the first American directors to be recognized as an auteur. In a career of more than 50 years, he directed over 130 films between 1917 and 1970 (although most of his silent films are now lost), and received a record four Academy Awards for Best Director for The Informer (1935), The Grapes of Wrath (1940), How Green Was My Valley (1941), and The Quiet Man (1952).

Ford is renowned for his Westerns, such as Stagecoach (1939), My Darling Clementine (1946), Fort Apache (1948), The Searchers (1956), and The Man Who Shot Liberty Valance (1962); though he worked in many other genres, including comedies, period dramas, and documentaries. He made frequent use of location shooting and wide shots, in which his characters were framed against a vast, harsh, and rugged natural terrain. He is credited with launching the careers of some of Hollywood's biggest stars during the 1930s, 1940s, and 1950s, including John Wayne, Henry Fonda, Maureen O'Hara and James Stewart.

Ford's work was held in high regard by his contemporaries, with Akira Kurosawa, Orson Welles, Frank Capra, Andrei Tarkovsky, and Ingmar Bergman naming him one of the greatest directors of all time. Subsequent generations of directors, including many of the major figures of the New Hollywood movement, have cited his influence. The Harvard Film Archive writes that "the breadth and measure of Ford's major contributions to the Golden Age of Hollywood cinema, and to film language in general, remains somewhat difficult to discern.... Rarely recognized in full are Ford's great achievements as a consummate visual stylist and master storyteller."

== Early life and education ==
Ford was born John Martin "Jack" Feeney (though he later often gave his given names as Seán Aloysius, sometimes with surname O'Feeny or Ó Fearna; an Irish language equivalent of Feeney) in Cape Elizabeth, Maine, to John Augustine Feeney and Barbara "Abbey" Curran, on February 1, 1894, (though he occasionally said 1895 and that date is erroneously inscribed on his tombstone). His father, John Augustine Feeney, was born in Spiddal, County Galway, Ireland, in 1854. Barbara Curran was born in the Aran Islands, in the town of Kilronan on the island of Inishmore (Inis Mór). John Augustine Feeney's grandmother, Barbara Morris, was said to be a member of an impoverished branch of a family of the Irish nobility, the Morrises of Spiddal (headed at present by Lord Killanin).

John Augustine Feeney and Barbara Curran arrived in Boston and Portland respectively in May and June 1872. They filed their intentions to marry on July 31, 1875, and became American citizens five years later on September 11, 1880. The John Augustine Feeney family resided on Sheridan Street, in the Irish neighborhood of Munjoy Hill in Portland, Maine, and his father worked a variety of odd jobs to support the family—farming, fishing, a laborer for the gas company, saloon keeping, and an alderman. In interviews John Ford said that his family was well off, he said that they had a farm and his father fished. John and Barbara had eleven children: Mamie (Mary Agnes), born 1876; Delia (Edith), 1878–1881; Patrick; Francis Ford, 1881–1953; Bridget, 1883–1884; Barbara, born and died 1888; Edward, born 1889; Josephine, born 1891; Hannah (Joanna), born and died 1892; John Martin, 1894–1973; and Daniel, born and died 1896 (or 1898).

Feeney attended Portland High School, Portland, Maine, where he played fullback and defensive tackle. He earned the nickname "Bull" because, it is said, of the way he would lower his helmet and charge the line. A Portland pub, named "Bull Feeney's" in his honor, was open from 2002 to 2023. He later moved to California, and in 1914 began working in film production as well as acting for his older brother Francis, adopting "Jack Ford" as a professional name. In addition to credited roles, he appeared uncredited as a Klansman in D. W. Griffith's 1915 The Birth of a Nation.

He married Mary McBride Smith on July 3, 1920, and they had two children. His daughter Barbara was married to singer and actor Ken Curtis from 1952 to 1964. The marriage between Ford and Smith lasted for life despite various issues, one being that Ford was Catholic while she was a non-Catholic divorcée. What difficulty was caused by this is unclear as the level of Ford's commitment to the Catholic faith is disputed. Another strain was Ford's many extramarital relationships.

== Directing career ==
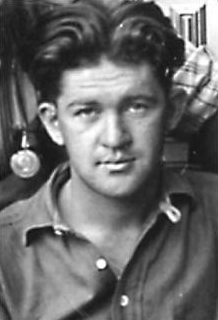
Ford in 1915

Ford began his career in film after moving to California in July 1914. He followed in the footsteps of his multi-talented older brother Francis Ford, twelve years his senior, who had left home years earlier and had worked in vaudeville before becoming a movie actor. Francis played in hundreds of silent pictures for filmmakers such as Thomas Edison, Georges Méliès and Thomas Ince, eventually progressing to become a prominent Hollywood actor-writer-director with his own production company (101 Bison) at Universal.

Ford started out in his brother's films as an assistant, handyman, stuntman and occasional actor, frequently doubling for his brother, whom he closely resembled. Francis gave his younger brother his first acting role in The Mysterious Rose (November 1914). Despite an often combative relationship, within three years Jack had progressed to become Francis' chief assistant and often worked as his cameraman. By the time Jack Ford was given his first break as a director, Francis' profile was declining and he ceased working as a director soon after.

Ford's films used a 'stock company' of actors, far more so than many directors. Many famous stars appeared in at least two or more Ford films, including Harry Carey Sr., (the star of 25 Ford silent films), Will Rogers, John Wayne, Henry Fonda, Maureen O'Hara, James Stewart, Woody Strode, Richard Widmark, Victor McLaglen, Vera Miles and Jeffrey Hunter. Many of his supporting actors appeared in multiple Ford films, often over a period of several decades, including Ben Johnson, Chill Wills, Andy Devine, Ward Bond, Grant Withers, Mae Marsh, Anna Lee, Harry Carey Jr., Ken Curtis, Frank Baker, Dolores del Río, Pedro Armendáriz, Hank Worden, John Qualen, Barry Fitzgerald, Arthur Shields, John Carradine, O. Z. Whitehead and Carleton Young. Core members of this extended 'troupe', including Ward Bond, John Carradine, Harry Carey Jr., Mae Marsh, Frank Baker, and Ben Johnson, were informally known as the John Ford Stock Company.

Likewise, Ford enjoyed extended working relationships with his production team, and many of his crew worked with him for decades. He made numerous films with the same major collaborators, including producer and business partner Merian C. Cooper, scriptwriters Nunnally Johnson, Dudley Nichols and Frank S. Nugent, and cinematographers Ben F. Reynolds, John W. Brown and George Schneiderman (who between them shot most of Ford's silent films), Joseph H. August, Gregg Toland, Winton Hoch, Charles Lawton Jr., Bert Glennon, Archie Stout and William H. Clothier. Most of Ford's postwar films were edited by Jack Murray until the latter's 1961 death. Otho Lovering, who had first worked with Ford on Stagecoach (1939), became Ford's principal editor after Murray's death.

=== Silent era ===
During his first decade as a director Ford worked on dozens of features (including many westerns) but only ten of the more than sixty silent films he made between 1917 and 1928 still survive in their entirety. However, prints of several Ford 'silents' previously thought lost have been rediscovered in foreign film archives over recent years—in 2009 a trove of 75 Hollywood silent films was rediscovered in the New Zealand Film Archive, among which was the only surviving print of Ford's 1927 silent comedy Upstream. The print was restored in New Zealand by the Academy of Motion Picture Arts & Sciences before being returned to America, where it was given a "Re-Premiere" at the Samuel Goldwyn Theater in Beverly Hills on August 31, 2010, featuring a newly commissioned score by Michael Mortilla.

Throughout his career, Ford was one of the busiest directors in Hollywood, but he was extraordinarily productive in his first few years as a director—he made ten films in 1917, eight in 1918 and fifteen in 1919—and he directed a total of 62 shorts and features between 1917 and 1928, although he was not given a screen credit in most of his earliest films.

There is some uncertainty about the identity of Ford's first film as director—film writer Ephraim Katz notes that Ford might have directed the four-part film Lucille the Waitress as early as 1914—but most sources cite his directorial début as the silent two-reeler The Tornado, released in March 1917. According to Ford's own story, he was given the job by Universal boss Carl Laemmle who supposedly said, "Give Jack Ford the job—he yells good". The Tornado was quickly followed by a string of two-reeler and three-reeler "quickies"—The Trail of Hate, The Scrapper, The Soul Herder and Cheyenne's Pal; these were made over the space of a few months and each typically shot in just two or three days; all are now presumed lost. The Soul Herder is also notable as the beginning of Ford's four-year, 25-film association with veteran writer-actor Harry Carey, who (with Ford's brother Francis) was a strong early influence on the young director, as well as being one of the major influences on the screen persona of Ford's protege John Wayne. Carey's son Harry "Dobe" Carey Jr., who also became an actor, was one of Ford's closest friends in later years and featured in many of his most celebrated westerns.

Ford's first feature-length production was Straight Shooting (August 1917), which is also his earliest complete surviving film as director, and one of only three survivors from his twenty-six film collaboration with Harry Carey. In making the film Ford and Carey ignored studio orders and turned in five reels instead of two, and it was only through the intervention of Carl Laemmle that the film escaped being cut for its first release, although it was subsequently edited down to two reels for re-release in the late 1920s. Ford's last film of 1917, Bucking Broadway, was long thought to have been lost, but in 2002 the only known surviving print was discovered in the archives of the French National Center for Cinematography and it has since been restored and digitized. Similarly, The Scarlet Drop, his 1918 film once thought lost, was rediscovered in a warehouse in Santiago, Chile.

Ford directed around 36 films over three years for Universal before moving to the William Fox studio in 1920; his first film for them was Just Pals (1920). His 1923 feature Cameo Kirby, starring screen idol John Gilbert—another of the few surviving Ford silents—marked his first directing credit under the name "John Ford", rather than "Jack Ford", as he had previously been credited.

Ford's first major success as a director was the historical drama The Iron Horse (1924), an epic account of the building of the First transcontinental railroad. It was a large, long and difficult production, filmed on location in the Sierra Nevada. The logistics were enormous—two entire towns were constructed, there were 5000 extras, 100 cooks, 2000 rail layers, a cavalry regiment, 800 Native Americans, 1300 bison, 2000 horses, 10,000 cattle and 50,000 properties, including the original stagecoach used by Horace Greeley, Wild Bill Hickok's derringer pistol and replicas of the "Jupiter" and "119" locomotives that met at Promontory Summit when the two ends of the line were joined on May 10, 1869.

Although Ford was to become one of the most honored of Hollywood directors (by film-makers as well as critics) his reputation in 1928 was modest at best. While he proved himself a commercially responsible director, only two or three of his films had earned more than passing notice. The pre-1929 Ford, according to Andrew Sarris, seemed to deserve "at most a footnote in film history".

— Film historian Richard Koszarski, 1976

Ford's brother Eddie was a crew member and they fought constantly; on one occasion Eddie reportedly "went after the old man with a pick handle". There was only a short synopsis written when filming began and Ford wrote and shot the film day by day. Production fell behind schedule, delayed by constant bad weather and the intense cold, and Fox executives repeatedly demanded results, but Ford would either tear up the telegrams or hold them up and have stunt gunman Edward "Pardner" Jones shoot holes through the sender's name. Despite the pressure to halt the production, studio boss William Fox finally backed Ford and allowed him to finish the picture and his gamble paid off handsomely—The Iron Horse became one of the top-grossing films of the decade, taking over US$2 million worldwide, against a budget of $280,000.

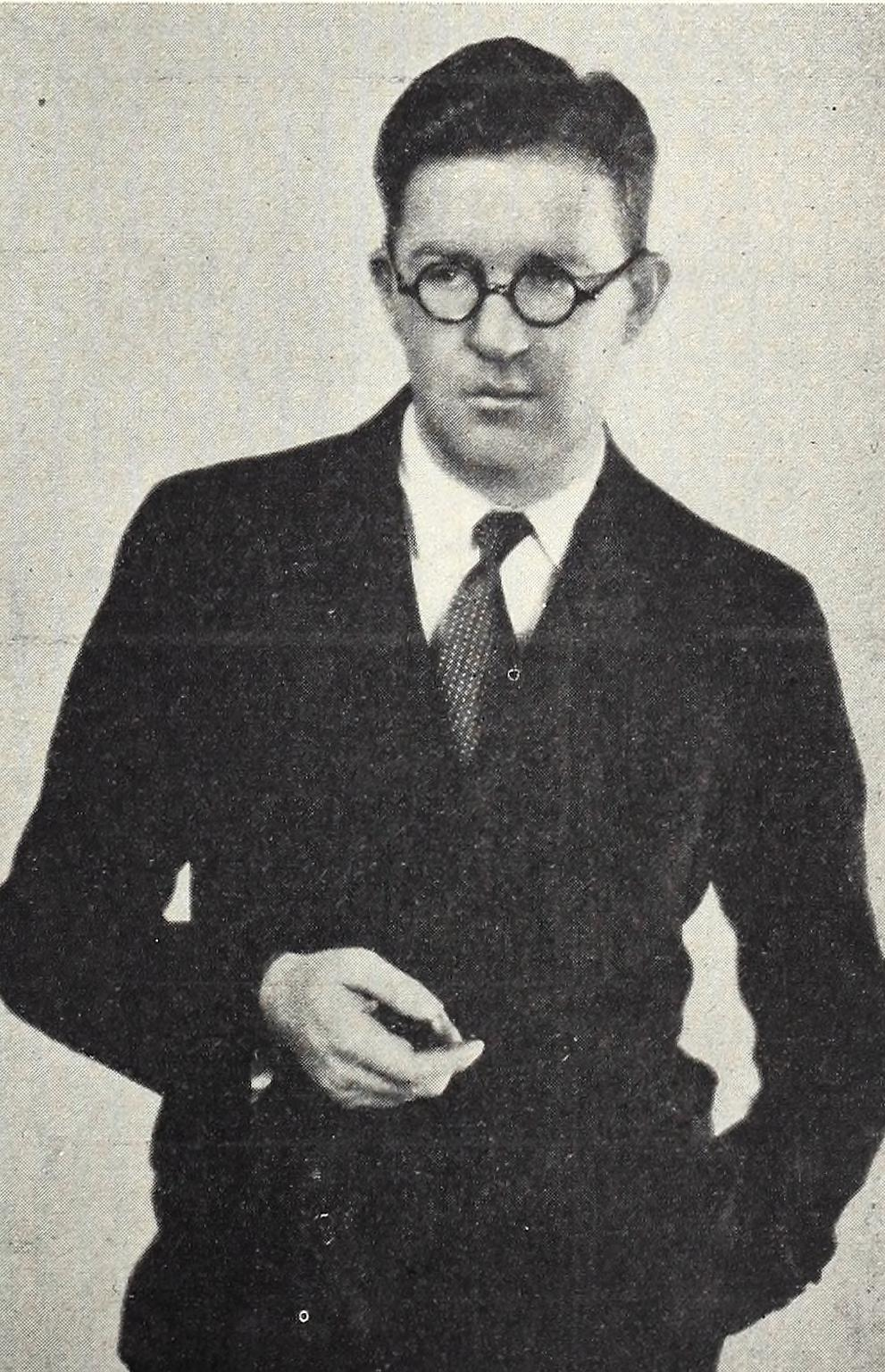
Ford c. 1926

Ford made a wide range of films in this period, and he became well known for his Western and "frontier" pictures, but the genre rapidly lost its appeal for major studios in the late 1920s. Ford's last silent Western was 3 Bad Men (1926), set during the Dakota land rush and filmed at Jackson Hole, Wyoming and in the Mojave Desert. It would be thirteen years before he made his next Western, Stagecoach, in 1939.

During the 1920s, Ford also served as president of the Motion Picture Directors Association, a forerunner to today's Directors Guild of America.

=== Talkies: 1928–1939 ===
Ford was one of the pioneer directors of sound films; he shot Fox's first song sung on screen, for his film Mother Machree (1928) of which only four of the original seven reels survive; this film is also notable as the first Ford film to feature the young John Wayne (as an uncredited extra) and he appeared as an extra in several of Ford's films over the next two years. Moreover, Hangman's House (1928) is notable as it features John Wayne's first confirmed onscreen appearance in a Ford film, playing an excitable spectator during the horse race sequence.

Just before the studio converted to talkies, Fox gave a contract to the German director F. W. Murnau, and his film Sunrise: A Song of Two Humans (1927), still highly regarded by critics, had a powerful effect on Ford. Murnau's influence can be seen in many of Ford's films of the late 1920s and early 1930s—Four Sons (1928), was filmed on some of the lavish sets left over from Murnau's production.

In November that year, Ford directed Fox's first all-talking dramatic featurette Napoleon's Barber (1928), a 3-reeler which is now considered a lost film. Napoleon's Barber was followed by his final two silent features Riley the Cop (1928) and Strong Boy (1929), starring Victor McLaglen; which were both released with synchronised music scores and sound effects, the latter is now lost (although Tag Gallagher's book records that the only surviving copy of Strong Boy, a 35 mm nitrate print, was rumored to be held in a private collection in Australia. The Black Watch (1929), a colonial army adventure set in the Khyber Pass starring Victor McLaglen and Myrna Loy is Ford's first all-talking feature; it was remade in 1954 by Henry King as King of the Khyber Rifles.

Ford's output was fairly constant from 1928 to the start of World War II; he made five features in 1928 and then made either two or three films every year from 1929 to 1942, inclusive. Three films were released in 1929—Strong Boy, The Black Watch and Salute. His three films of 1930 were Men Without Women, Born Reckless and Up the River, which is notable as the debut film for both Spencer Tracy and Humphrey Bogart, who were both signed to Fox on Ford's recommendation (but subsequently dropped). Ford's films in 1931 were Seas Beneath, The Brat and Arrowsmith; the last-named, adapted from the Sinclair Lewis novel and starring Ronald Colman and Helen Hayes, marked Ford's first Academy Awards recognition, with five nominations including Best Picture.

Ford's efficiency and his ability to craft films combining artfulness with strong commercial appeal won him increasing renown. By 1940 he was acknowledged as one of the world's foremost movie directors. His growing prestige was reflected in his remuneration—in 1920, when he moved to Fox, he was paid $300–600 per week. As his career took off in the mid-Twenties his annual income significantly increased. He earned nearly $134,000 in 1929, and made over $100,000 per annum every year from 1934 to 1941, earning a staggering $220,068 in 1938—more than double the salary of the U.S. president at that time (although this was still less than half the income of Carole Lombard, Hollywood's highest-paid star of the 1930s, who was earning around $500,000 per year at the time).

With film production affected by the Depression, Ford made two films each in 1932 and 1933—Air Mail (made for Universal) with a young Ralph Bellamy and Flesh (for MGM) with Wallace Beery. In 1933, he returned to Fox for Pilgrimage and Doctor Bull, the first of his three films with Will Rogers.

The World War I desert drama The Lost Patrol (1934), based on the book Patrol by Philip MacDonald, was a superior remake of the 1929 silent film Lost Patrol. It starred Victor McLaglen as The Sergeant—the role played by his brother Cyril McLaglen in the earlier version—with Boris Karloff, Wallace Ford, Alan Hale and Reginald Denny (who went on to found a company that made radio-controlled target aircraft during World War II). It was one of Ford's first big hits of the sound era—it was rated by both the National Board of Review and The New York Times as one of the Top 10 films of that year and won an Oscar nomination for its stirring Max Steiner score. It was followed later that year by The World Moves On with Madeleine Carroll and Franchot Tone, and the highly successful Judge Priest, his second film with Will Rogers, which became one of the top-grossing films of the year.

Ford's first film of 1935 (made for Columbia) was the mistaken-identity comedy The Whole Town's Talking with Edward G. Robinson and Jean Arthur, released in the UK as Passport to Fame, and it drew critical praise. Steamboat Round The Bend was his third and final film with Will Rogers; it is probable they would have continued working together, but their collaboration was cut short by Rogers' untimely death in a plane crash in May 1935, which devastated Ford.

Ford confirmed his position in the top rank of American directors with the Murnau-influenced Irish Republican Army drama The Informer (1935), starring Victor McLaglen. It earned great critical praise, was nominated for Best Picture, won Ford his first Academy Award for Best Director, and was hailed at the time as one of the best films ever made, although its reputation has diminished considerably compared to other contenders like Citizen Kane, or Ford's own later The Searchers (1956).

The politically charged The Prisoner of Shark Island (1936)—which marked the debut with Ford of long-serving "Stock Company" player John Carradine—explored the little-known story of Samuel Mudd, a physician who was caught up in the Abraham Lincoln assassination conspiracy and consigned to an offshore prison for treating the injured John Wilkes Booth. Other films of this period include the South Seas melodrama The Hurricane (1937) and the lighthearted Shirley Temple vehicle Wee Willie Winkie (1937), each of which had a first-year US gross of more than $1 million. During filming of Wee Willie Winkie, Ford had elaborate sets built on the Iverson Movie Ranch in Chatsworth, Calif., a heavily filmed location ranch most closely associated with serials and B-Westerns, which would become, along with Monument Valley, one of the director's preferred filming locations, and a site to which Ford would return in the next few years for Stagecoach and The Grapes of Wrath.

The longer revised version of Directed by John Ford shown on Turner Classic Movies in November 2006 features directors Steven Spielberg, Clint Eastwood, and Martin Scorsese, who suggest that the string of classic films Ford directed during 1936 to 1941 was due in part to an intense six-month extramarital affair with Katharine Hepburn, the star of Mary of Scotland (1936), an Elizabethan costume drama.

=== 1939–1941 ===
Stagecoach (1939) was Ford's first western since 3 Bad Men in 1926, and it was his first with sound. Orson Welles claimed that he watched Stagecoach forty times in preparation for making Citizen Kane. It remains one of the most admired and imitated of all Hollywood movies, not least for its climactic stagecoach chase and the hair-raising horse-jumping scene, performed by the stuntman Yakima Canutt.

The Dudley Nichols–Ben Hecht screenplay was based on an Ernest Haycox story that Ford had spotted in Collier's magazine and he purchased the screen rights for just $2500. Production chief Walter Wanger urged Ford to hire Gary Cooper and Marlene Dietrich for the lead roles, but eventually accepted Ford's decision to cast Claire Trevor as Dallas and a virtual unknown, his friend John Wayne, as Ringo; Wanger reportedly had little further influence over the production.

In making Stagecoach, Ford faced entrenched industry prejudice about the now-hackneyed genre which he had helped to make so popular. Although low-budget western features and serials were still being churned out in large numbers by "Poverty Row" studios, the genre had fallen out of favor with the big studios during the 1930s and they were regarded as B-grade "pulp" movies at best. As a result, Ford shopped the project around Hollywood for almost a year, offering it unsuccessfully to both Joseph Kennedy and David O. Selznick before finally linking with Walter Wanger, an independent producer working through United Artists.

Stagecoach is significant for several reasons—it exploded industry prejudices by becoming both a critical and commercial hit, grossing over US$1 million in its first year (against a budget of just under $400,000), and its success (along with the 1939 Westerns Destry Rides Again with James Stewart and Marlene Dietrich, Cecil B. DeMille's Union Pacific with Joel McCrea, and Michael Curtiz's Dodge City with Errol Flynn), revitalized the moribund genre, showing that Westerns could be "intelligent, artful, great entertainment—and profitable". It was nominated for seven Academy Awards, including Best Picture and Best Director, and won two Oscars, for Best Supporting Actor (Thomas Mitchell) and Best Score. Stagecoach became the first in the series of seven classic Ford Westerns filmed on location in Monument Valley, with additional footage shot at another of Ford's favorite filming locations, the Iverson Movie Ranch in Chatsworth, Calif., where he had filmed much of Wee Willie Winkie two years earlier. Ford skillfully blended Iverson and Monument Valley to create the movie's iconic images of the American West.

John Wayne had good reason to be grateful for Ford's support; Stagecoach provided the actor with the career breakthrough that elevated him to international stardom. Over 35 years Wayne appeared in 24 of Ford's films and three television episodes. Ford is credited with playing a major role in shaping Wayne's screen image. Cast member Louise Platt, in a letter recounting the experience of the film's production, quoted Ford saying of Wayne's future in film: "He'll be the biggest star ever because he is the perfect 'everyman.'"

Stagecoach marked the beginning of the most consistently successful phase of Ford's career—in just two years between 1939 and 1941 he created a string of classics films that won numerous Academy Awards. Ford's next film, the biopic Young Mr Lincoln (1939) starring Henry Fonda, was less successful than Stagecoach, attracting little critical attention and winning no awards. It was not a major box-office hit although it had a respectable domestic first-year gross of $750,000, but Ford scholar Tag Gallagher describes it as "a deeper, more multi-leveled work than Stagecoach...(which) seems in retrospect one of the finest prewar pictures".

Drums Along the Mohawk (1939) was a lavish frontier drama co-starring Henry Fonda, Claudette Colbert and John Carradine; it was also Ford's first movie in color and included uncredited script contributions by William Faulkner. It was a big box-office success, grossing $1.25 million in its first year in the US and earning Edna May Oliver a Best Supporting Actress Oscar nomination for her performance.

Despite its uncompromising humanist and political stance, Ford's screen adaptation of John Steinbeck's The Grapes of Wrath (scripted by Nunnally Johnson and photographed by Gregg Toland) was both a big box office hit and a major critical success, and it is still widely regarded as one of the best Hollywood films of the era. Noted critic Andrew Sarris described it as the movie that transformed Ford from "a storyteller of the screen into America's cinematic poet laureate". Ford's third movie in a year and his third consecutive film with Fonda, it grossed $1.1 million in the US in its first year and won two Academy Awards—Ford's second 'Best Director' Oscar, and 'Best Supporting Actress' for Jane Darwell's tour-de-force portrayal of Ma Joad. During production, Ford returned to the Iverson Movie Ranch in Chatsworth, Calif., to film a number of key shots, including the pivotal image depicting the migrant family's first full view of the fertile farmland of California, which was represented by the San Fernando Valley as seen from the Iverson Ranch.

The Grapes of Wrath was followed by two less successful and lesser-known films. The Long Voyage Home (1940) was, like Stagecoach, made with Walter Wanger through United Artists. Adapted from four plays by Eugene O'Neill, it was scripted by Dudley Nichols and Ford, in consultation with O'Neill. Although not a significant box-office success (it grossed only $600,000 in its first year), it was critically praised and was nominated for seven Academy Awards—Best Picture, Best Screenplay, (Nichols), Best Music, Original Score (Richard Hageman), Best Photography (Gregg Toland), Best Editing (Sherman Todd), Best Effects (Ray Binger & R.T. Layton), and Best Sound (Robert Parrish). It was one of Ford's personal favorites; stills from it decorated his home and O'Neill also reportedly loved the film and screened it periodically.

Tobacco Road (1941) was a rural comedy scripted by Nunnally Johnson, adapted from the long-running Jack Kirkland stage version of the novel by Erskine Caldwell. It starred veteran actor Charley Grapewin and the supporting cast included Ford regulars Ward Bond and Mae Marsh, with Francis Ford in an uncredited bit part; it is also notable for early screen appearances by future stars Gene Tierney and Dana Andrews. Although not highly regarded by some critics, it was fairly successful at the box office, grossing $900,000 in its first year. The film was banned in Australia.

Ford's last feature before America entered World War II was his screen adaptation of How Green Was My Valley (1941), starring Walter Pidgeon, Maureen O'Hara and Roddy McDowall in his career-making role as Huw. The script was written by Philip Dunne from the best-selling novel by Richard Llewellyn. It was originally planned as a four-hour epic to rival Gone with the Wind—the screen rights alone cost Fox $300,000—and was to have been filmed on location in Wales, but this was abandoned due to the heavy German bombing of Britain. A search of Southern California locations resulted in the set for the village being built on the grounds of the Crags Country Club (later the Fox ranch, now the core of Malibu Creek State Park). Another reported factor was the nervousness of Fox executives about the pro-union tone of the story. William Wyler was originally engaged to direct, but he left the project when Fox decided to film it in California; Ford was hired in his place and production was postponed for several months until he became available. Producer Darryl F. Zanuck had a strong influence over the movie and made several key decisions, including the idea of having the character of Huw narrate the film in voice-over (then a novel concept), and the decision that Huw's character should not age (Tyrone Power was originally slated to play the adult Huw).

How Green Was My Valley became one of the biggest films of 1941. It was nominated for ten Academy Awards including Best Supporting Actress (Sara Allgood), Best Editing, Best Script, Best Music and Best Sound and it won five Oscars—Best Director, Best Picture, Best Supporting Actor (Donald Crisp), Best B&W Cinematography (Arthur C. Miller) and Best Art Direction/Interior Decoration. It was a huge hit with audiences, coming in behind Sergeant York as the second-highest-grossing film of the year in the US and taking almost $3 million against its sizable budget of $1,250,000.Ford was also named Best Director by the New York Film Critics, and this was one of the few awards of his career that he collected in person (he generally shunned the Oscar ceremony).

=== War years ===
During World War II, Ford served as head of the photographic unit for the Office of Strategic Services and made documentaries for the Navy Department. He was commissioned as a commander in the United States Navy Reserve. According to Searching for John Ford, "Ford and his men concentrated largely on secret photographic missions for the OSS." In 1961 Ford told a magazine, "Our job was to photograph both for the records and for our intelligence assessment, the work of guerrillas, saboteurs, Resistance outfits." He won two more Academy Awards during this time, one for the semi-documentary The Battle of Midway (1942), and one for the propaganda film December 7: The Movie (1943). Ford filmed the Japanese attack on Midway from the power plant of Sand Island and was wounded in the left arm by a machine gun bullet.

Ford was also present on Omaha Beach on D-Day. He crossed the English Channel on the USS Plunkett (DD-431), which anchored off Omaha Beach at 0600. He observed the first wave land on the beach from the ship, landing on the beach himself later with a team of Coast Guard cameramen who filmed the battle from behind the beach obstacles, with Ford directing operations. The film was edited in London, but very little was released to the public. Ford explained in a 1964 interview that the US Government was "afraid to show so many American casualties on the screen", adding that all of the D-Day film "still exists in color in storage in Anacostia near Washington, D.C." Thirty years later, historian Stephen E. Ambrose reported that the Eisenhower Center had been unable to find the film. A film partially matching Ford's description was unearthed by the U.S. National Archives in 2014. Other researchers assert that Ford did not personally land on Omaha Beach on D-Day (arriving rather a day or two later) and that John Ford's D-Day footage is by and large a "tall tale."

Ford eventually rose to become a top adviser to OSS head William Joseph Donovan. According to records released in 2008, Ford was cited by his superiors for bravery, taking a position to film one mission that was "an obvious and clear target". He survived "continuous attack and was wounded" while he continued filming, one commendation in his file states. In 1945, Ford executed affidavits testifying to the integrity of films taken to document conditions at Nazi concentration camps.

His last wartime film was They Were Expendable (MGM, 1945), an account of America's disastrous defeat in the Philippines, told from the viewpoint of a PT boat squadron and its commander. Ford created a part for the recovering Ward Bond, who needed money. Although he was seen throughout the movie, he never walked until they put in a part where he was shot in the leg. For the rest of the picture, he was able to use a crutch on the final march. Ford repeatedly declared that he disliked the film and had never watched it, complaining that he had been forced to make it, although it was strongly championed by filmmaker Lindsay Anderson. Released several months after the end of the war, it was among the year's top 20 box-office draws, although Tag Gallagher notes that many critics have incorrectly claimed that it lost money.

=== Post-war career ===
After the war, Ford remained an officer in the United States Navy Reserve. He returned to active service during the Korean War, and was promoted to Rear Admiral the day he left service.

Ford directed sixteen features and several documentaries in the decade between 1946 and 1956. As with his pre-war career, his films alternated between (relative) box office flops and major successes, but most of his later films made a solid profit, and Fort Apache, The Quiet Man, Mogambo and The Searchers all ranked in the Top 20 box-office hits of their respective years.

Ford's first postwar movie My Darling Clementine (Fox, 1946) was a romanticized retelling of the primal Western legend of Wyatt Earp and the Gunfight at the O.K. Corral, with exterior sequences filmed on location in the visually spectacular (but geographically inappropriate) Monument Valley. It reunited Ford with Henry Fonda (as Earp) and co-starred Victor Mature in one of his best roles as the consumptive, Shakespeare-loving Doc Holliday, with Ward Bond and Tim Holt as the Earp brothers, Linda Darnell as sultry saloon girl Chihuahua, a strong performance by Walter Brennan (in a rare villainous role) as the venomous Old Man Clanton, with Jane Darwell and an early screen appearance by John Ireland as Billy Clanton. In contrast to the string of successes in 1939–1941, it won no major American awards, although it was awarded a silver ribbon for Best Foreign Film in 1948 by the Italian National Syndicate of Film Journalists, and it was a solid financial success, grossing $2.75 million in the United States and $1.75 million internationally in its first year of release.

==== Argosy years ====
Refusing a lucrative contract offered by Zanuck at 20th Century Fox that would have guaranteed him $600,000 per year, Ford launched himself as an independent director-producer and made many of his films in this period with Argosy Pictures Corporation, which was a partnership between Ford and his old friend and colleague Merian C. Cooper. Ford and Cooper had previously been involved with the distinct Argosy Corporation, which was established after the success of Stagecoach (1939); Argosy Corporation produced one film, The Long Voyage Home (1940), before the Second World War intervened. The Fugitive (1947), again starring Fonda, was the first project of Argosy Pictures. It was a loose adaptation of Graham Greene's The Power and the Glory, which Ford had originally intended to make at Fox before the war, with Thomas Mitchell as the priest. Filmed on location in Mexico, it was photographed by distinguished Mexican cinematographer Gabriel Figueroa (who later worked with Luis Buñuel). The supporting cast included Dolores del Río, J. Carrol Naish, Ward Bond, Leo Carrillo and Mel Ferrer (making his screen début) and a cast of mainly Mexican extras. Ford reportedly considered this his best film but it fared relatively poorly compared to its predecessor, grossing only $750,000 in its first year. It also caused a rift between Ford and scriptwriter Dudley Nichols that brought about the end of their highly successful collaboration. Greene himself had a particular dislike of this adaptation of his work.

Fort Apache (Argosy/RKO, 1948) was the first part of Ford's so-called 'Cavalry Trilogy', all of which were based on stories by James Warner Bellah. It featured many of his 'Stock Company' of actors, including John Wayne, Henry Fonda, Ward Bond, Victor McLaglen, Mae Marsh, Francis Ford (as a bartender), Frank Baker, Ben Johnson and also featured Shirley Temple, in her final appearance for Ford and one of her last film appearances. It also marked the start of the long association between Ford and scriptwriter Frank S. Nugent, a former New York Times film critic who (like Dudley Nichols) had not written a movie script until hired by Ford. It was a big commercial success, grossing nearly $5 million worldwide in its first year and ranking in the Top 20 box office hits of 1948.

During that year Ford also assisted his friend and colleague Howard Hawks, who was having problems with his current film Red River (which starred John Wayne) and Ford reportedly made numerous editing suggestions, including the use of a narrator. Fort Apache was followed by another Western, 3 Godfathers, a remake of a 1916 silent film starring Harry Carey (to whom Ford's version was dedicated), which Ford had himself already remade in 1919 as Marked Men, also with Carey and thought lost. It starred John Wayne, Pedro Armendáriz and Harry "Dobe" Carey Jr (in one of his first major roles) as three outlaws who rescue a baby after his mother (Mildred Natwick) dies giving birth, with Ward Bond as the sheriff pursuing them. The recurrent theme of sacrifice can also be found in The Outcasts of Poker Flat, Three Godfathers, The Wallop, Desperate Trails, Hearts of Oak, Bad Men, Men without Women.

In 1949, Ford briefly returned to Fox to direct Pinky. He prepared the project but worked only one day before being taken ill, supposedly with shingles, and Elia Kazan replaced him (although Tag Gallagher suggests that Ford's illness was a pretext for leaving the film, which Ford disliked).

His only completed film of that year was the second installment of his Cavalry Trilogy, She Wore a Yellow Ribbon (Argosy/RKO, 1949), starring John Wayne and Joanne Dru, with Victor McLaglen, John Agar, Ben Johnson, Mildred Natwick and Harry Carey Jr. Again filmed on location in Monument Valley, it was widely acclaimed for its stunning Technicolor cinematography (including the famous cavalry scene filmed in front of an oncoming storm); it won Winton Hoch the 1950 Academy Award for Best Color Cinematography and it did big business on its first release, grossing more than $5 million worldwide. John Wayne, then 41, also received wide praise for his role as the 60-year-old Captain Nathan Brittles.

==== 1950s ====
Ford's first film of 1950 was the offbeat military comedy When Willie Comes Marching Home, starring Dan Dailey and Corinne Calvet, with William Demarest, from Preston Sturges 'stock company', and early (uncredited) screen appearances by Alan Hale Jr. and Vera Miles. It was followed by Wagon Master, starring Ben Johnson and Harry Carey Jr, which is particularly noteworthy as the only Ford film since 1930 that he scripted himself. It was subsequently adapted into the long-running TV series Wagon Train (with Ward Bond reprising the title role until his sudden death in 1960). Although it did far smaller business than most of his other films in this period, Ford cited Wagon Master as his personal favorite out of all his films, telling Peter Bogdanovich that it "came closest to what I had hoped to achieve".

Rio Grande (Republic, 1950), the third part of the 'Cavalry Trilogy', co-starred John Wayne and Maureen O'Hara, with Wayne's son Patrick Wayne making his screen debut (he appeared in several subsequent Ford pictures including The Searchers). It was made at the insistence of Republic Pictures, who demanded a profitable Western as the condition of backing Ford's next project, The Quiet Man. A testament to Ford's legendary efficiency, Rio Grande was shot in just 32 days, with only 352 takes from 335 camera setups, and it was a solid success, grossing $2.25 million in its first year.

Republic's anxiety was erased by the resounding success of The Quiet Man (Republic, 1952), a pet project which Ford had wanted to make since the 1930s (and almost did so in 1937 with an independent cooperative called Renowned Artists Company). It became his biggest grossing picture to date, taking nearly $4 million in the US alone in its first year and ranking in the top 10 box office films of its year. It was nominated for seven Academy Awards and won Ford his fourth Oscar for Best Director, as well a second Best Cinematography Oscar for Winton Hoch. It was followed by What Price Glory? (1952), a World War I drama, the first of two films Ford made with James Cagney (Mister Roberts was the other) which also did good business at the box office ($2 million).

The Sun Shines Bright (1953), Ford's first entry in the Cannes Film Festival, was a western comedy-drama with Charles Winninger reviving the Judge Priest role made famous by Will Rogers in the 1930s. Ford later referred to it as one of his favorites, but it was poorly received, and was drastically cut (from 90 mins to 65 mins) by Republic soon after its release, with some excised scenes now presumed lost. It fared poorly at the box office and its failure contributed to the subsequent collapse of Argosy Pictures.

Ford's next film was the romance-adventure Mogambo (MGM, 1953), a loose remake of the celebrated 1932 film Red Dust. Filmed on location in Africa, it was photographed by British cinematographer Freddie Young and starred Ford's old friend Clark Gable, with Ava Gardner, Grace Kelly (who replaced an ailing Gene Tierney) and Donald Sinden. Although the production was difficult (exacerbated by the irritating presence of Gardner's then husband Frank Sinatra), Mogambo became one of the biggest commercial hits of Ford's career, with the highest domestic first-year gross of any of his films ($5.2 million); it also revitalized Gable's waning career and earned Best Actress and Best Supporting Actress Oscar nominations for Gardner and Kelly (who was rumored to have had a brief affair with Gable during the making of the film).

In 1955, Ford made the lesser-known West Point drama The Long Gray Line for Columbia Pictures, the first of two Ford films to feature Tyrone Power, who had originally been slated to star as the adult Huw in How Green Was My Valley back in 1941. Later in 1955, Ford was hired by Warner Bros to direct the Naval comedy Mister Roberts, starring Henry Fonda, Jack Lemmon, William Powell, and James Cagney, but there was conflict between Ford and Fonda, who had been playing the lead role on Broadway for the past seven years and had misgivings about Ford's direction. During a three-way meeting with producer Leland Hayward to try and iron out the problems, Ford became enraged and punched Fonda on the jaw, knocking him across the room, an action that created a lasting rift between them. After the incident Ford became increasingly morose, drinking heavily and eventually retreating to his yacht, the Araner, and refusing to eat or see anyone. Production was shut down for five days and Ford sobered up, but soon after he suffered a ruptured gallbladder, necessitating emergency surgery, and he was replaced by Mervyn LeRoy.

Ford also made his first forays into television in 1955, directing two half-hour dramas for network TV. In the summer of 1955 he made Rookie of the Year (Hal Roach Studios) for the TV series Studio Directors Playhouse; scripted by Frank S. Nugent, it featured Ford regulars John and Pat Wayne, Vera Miles and Ward Bond, with Ford himself appearing in the introduction. In November he made The Bamboo Cross (Lewman Ltd-Revue, 1955) for the Fireside Theater series; it starred Jane Wyman with an Asian-American cast and Stock Company veterans Frank Baker and Pat O'Malley in minor roles.

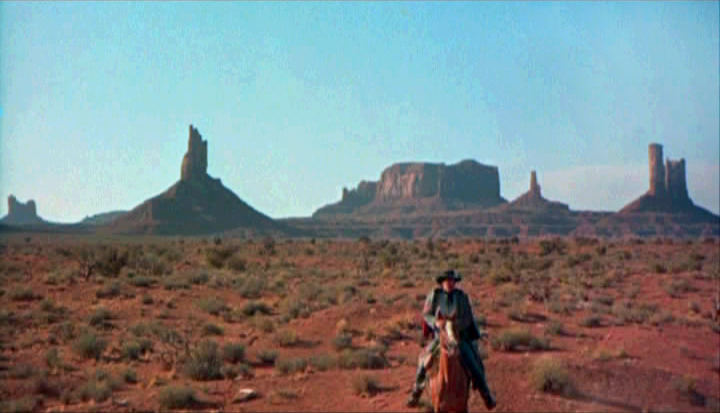
The Searchers (1956)

Ford returned to the big screen with The Searchers (Warner Bros, 1956), the only Western he made between 1950 and 1959, which is now widely regarded as not only one of his best films, but also by many as one of the greatest westerns, and one of the best performances of John Wayne's career. Set in 1868 Texas but shot on location in Monument Valley Utah-Arizona, it tells of the embittered Civil War veteran Ethan Edwards who spends years tracking down his niece, kidnapped by Comanches as a young girl. The supporting cast included Jeffrey Hunter, Ward Bond, Vera Miles and rising star Natalie Wood. It was Hunter's first film for Ford. It was very successful upon its first release and became one of the top 20 films of the year, grossing $4.45 million, although it received no Academy Award nominations. However, its reputation has grown greatly over the intervening years—it was named the Greatest Western of all time by the American Film Institute in 2008 and also placed 12th on the institute's 2007 list of the Top 100 greatest movies of all time. The Searchers has exerted a wide influence on film and popular culture—it has inspired (and been directly quoted by) many filmmakers including David Lean and George Lucas, Wayne's character's catchphrase "That'll be the day" inspired Texans Buddy Holly and his drummer Jerry Allison to pen their famous hit song of the same name, and the British pop group The Searchers also took their name from the film.

The Searchers was accompanied by one of the first "making of" documentaries, a four-part promotional program created for the "Behind the Camera" segment of the weekly Warner Bros. Presents TV show, (the studio's first foray into TV) which aired on the ABC network in 1955–56. Presented by Gig Young, the four segments included interviews with Jeffrey Hunter and Natalie Wood and behind-the-scenes footage shot during the making of the film.

The Wings of Eagles (MGM, 1957) was a fictionalized biography of Ford's old friend, aviator-turned-scriptwriter Frank "Spig" Wead, who had scripted several of Ford's early sound films. It starred John Wayne and Maureen O'Hara, with Ward Bond as John Dodge (a character based on Ford himself). It was followed by one of Ford's least known films, The Growler Story, a 29-minute dramatized documentary about the USS Growler. Made for the US Navy and filmed by the Pacific Fleet Command Combat Camera Group, it featured Ward Bond and Ken Curtis alongside real Navy personnel and their families.

Ford's next two films stand somewhat apart from the rest of his films in terms of production, and he notably took no salary for either job. The Rising of the Moon (Warner Bros, 1957) was a three-part 'omnibus' movie shot on location in Ireland and based on Irish short stories. It was made by Four Province Productions, a company established by Irish tycoon Lord Killanin, who had recently become Chair of the International Olympic Committee, and to whom Ford was distantly related. Killanin was also the actual (but uncredited) producer of The Quiet Man. The film failed to recoup its costs, earning less than half ($100,000) its negative cost of just over $256,000 and it stirred up some controversy in Ireland.

Both of Ford's 1958 films were made for Columbia Pictures and both were significant departures from Ford's norm. Gideon's Day (titled Gideon of Scotland Yard in the US) was adapted from the novel by British writer John Creasey. It is Ford's only police genre film, and one of the few Ford films set in the present day of the 1950s. It was shot in England with a British cast headed by Jack Hawkins, whom Ford (unusually) lauded as "the finest dramatic actor with whom I have worked". It was poorly promoted by Columbia, who only distributed it in B&W, although it was shot in color. It also failed to make a profit in its first year, earning only $400,000 against its budget of $453,000.

The Last Hurrah (Columbia, 1958), again set in present-day of the 1950s, starred Spencer Tracy, who had made his first film appearance in Ford's Up The River in 1930. Tracy plays an aging politician fighting his last campaign, with Jeffrey Hunter as his nephew. Katharine Hepburn reportedly facilitated a rapprochement between the two men, ending a long-running feud, and she convinced Tracy to take the lead role, which had originally been offered to Orson Welles (but was turned down by Welles' agent without his knowledge, much to his chagrin). It did considerably better business than either of Ford's two preceding films, grossing $950,000 in its first year. Anna Lee stated that Ford was "disappointed with the picture" and that Columbia had not permitted him to supervise the editing.

Korea: Battleground for Liberty (1959), Ford's second documentary on the Korean War, was made for the US Department of Defense as an orientation film for US soldiers stationed there.

It was followed by his last feature of the decade, The Horse Soldiers (Mirisch Company-United Artists, 1959), a heavily fictionalised Civil War story starring John Wayne, William Holden and Constance Towers. Although Ford professed unhappiness with the project, it was a commercial success, opening at #1 and ranking in the year's Top 20 box-office hits, grossing $3.6 million in its first year, and earning Ford his highest-ever fee—$375,000, plus 10% of the gross. The production was reportedly a difficult one for director and cast, and it incurred significant cost overruns, exacerbated by the unprecedented salaries awarded to Holden and Wayne ($750,000, plus 20% of the overall profit, each). Mirroring the on-screen tensions between Wayne and Holden's characters, the two actors argued constantly; Wayne was also struggling to help his wife Pilar overcome a barbiturate addiction, which climaxed with her attempted suicide while the couple were on location together in Louisiana. Ford's problems peaked with the tragic death of stuntman Fred Kennedy, who suffered a fatal neck fracture while executing a horse fall during the climactic battle sequence. Ford was devastated by the accident and lost interest in the film, moving the production back to Hollywood. He also scrapped the planned ending, depicting Marlowe's triumphant entry into Baton Rouge, instead concluding the film with John Marlowe's farewell to Hannah Hunter and the crossing and demolition of the bridge.

=== Last years, 1960–1973 ===
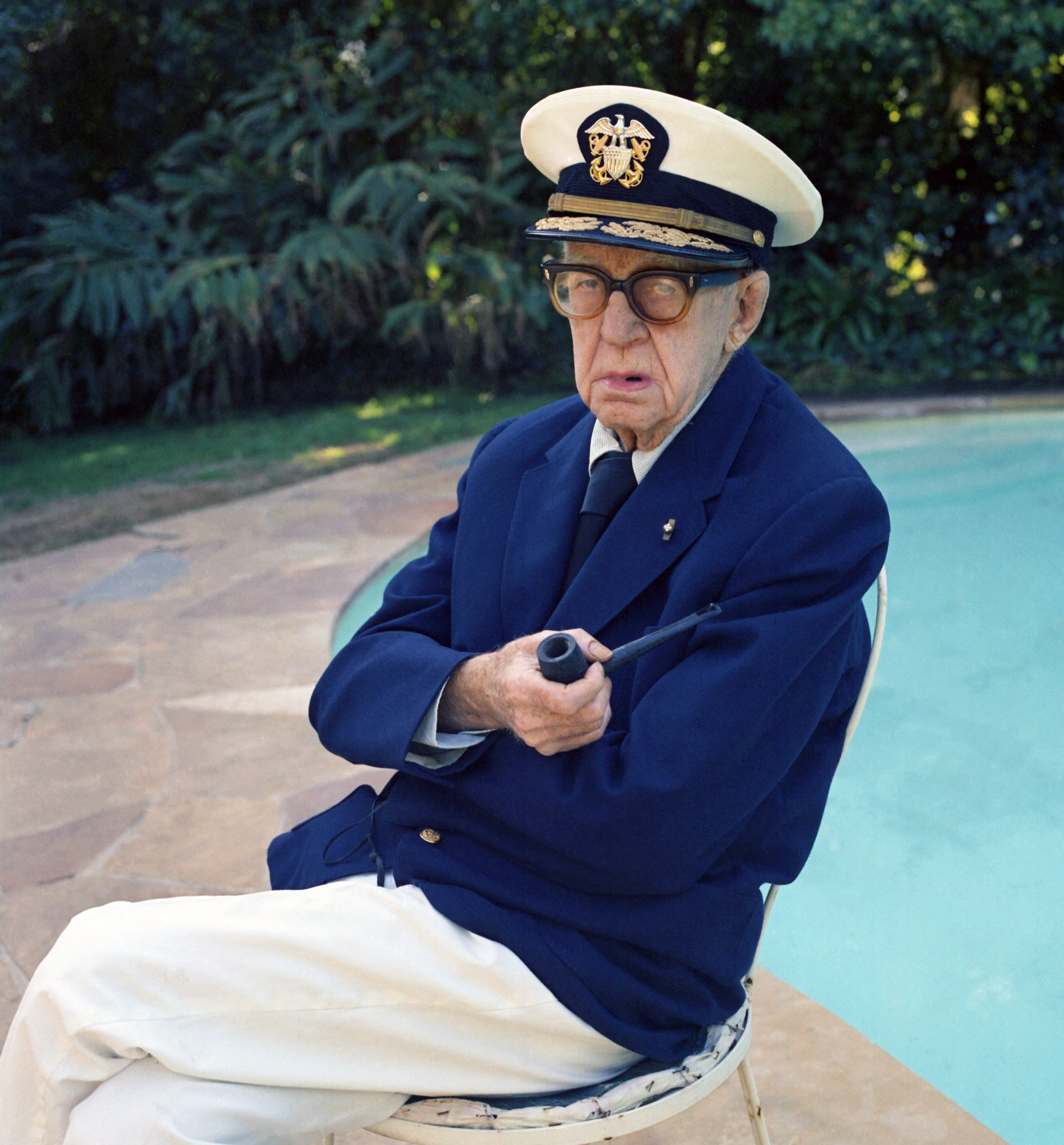
Ford in 1973

In his last years Ford was dogged by declining health, largely the result of decades of heavy drinking and smoking, and exacerbated by the wounds he suffered during the Battle of Midway. His vision, in particular, began to deteriorate rapidly and at one point he briefly lost his sight entirely; his prodigious memory also began to falter, making it necessary to rely more and more on assistants. His work was also restricted by the new regime in Hollywood, and he found it hard to get many projects made. By the 1960s he had been pigeonholed as a Western director and complained that he now found it almost impossible to get backing for projects in other genres.

Sergeant Rutledge (Ford Productions-Warner Bros, 1960) was Ford's last cavalry film. Set in the 1880s, it tells the story of an African-American cavalryman (played by Woody Strode) who is wrongfully accused of raping and murdering a white girl. It was erroneously marketed as a suspense film by Warners and was not a commercial success. During 1960, Ford made his third TV production, The Colter Craven Story, a one-hour episode of the network TV show Wagon Train, which included footage from Ford's Wagon Master (on which the series was based). He also visited the set of The Alamo, produced, directed by, and starring John Wayne, where his interference caused Wayne to send him out to film second-unit scenes which were never used (nor intended to be used) in the film.

Two Rode Together (Ford Productions-Columbia, 1961) co-starred James Stewart and Richard Widmark, with Shirley Jones and Stock Company regulars Andy Devine, Henry Brandon, Harry Carey Jr, Anna Lee, Woody Strode, Mae Marsh and Frank Baker, with an early screen appearance by Linda Cristal, who went on to star in the Western TV series The High Chaparral. It was a fair commercial success, grossing $1.6m in its first year.

Publicity stills from The Man Who Shot Liberty Valance

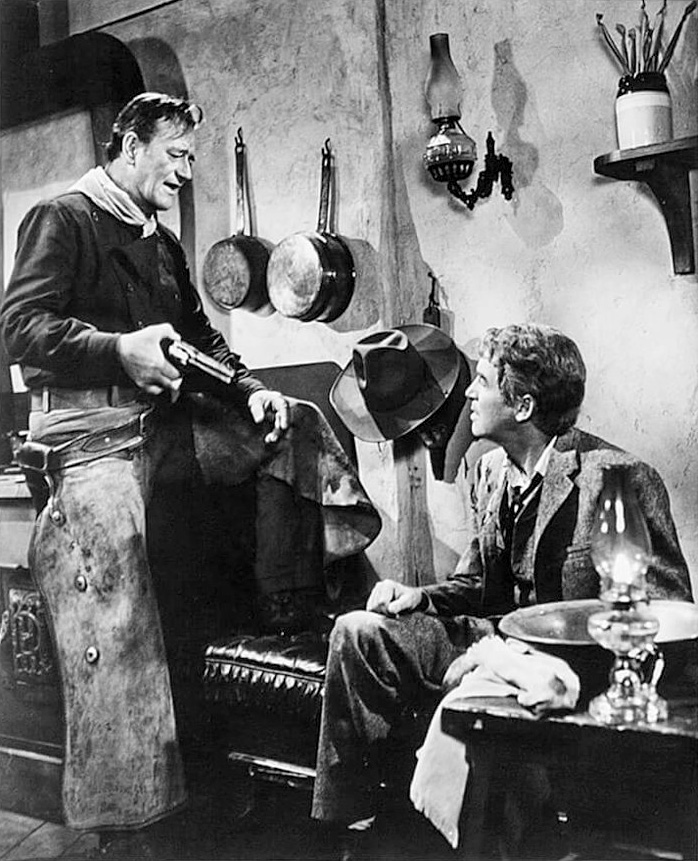
John Wayne and James Stewart

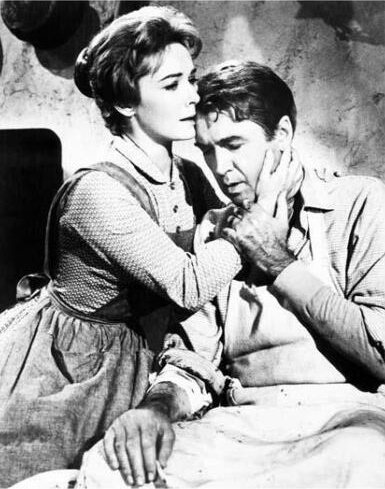
Vera Miles and Stewart

The Man Who Shot Liberty Valance (Ford Productions-Paramount, 1962) is frequently cited as the last great film of Ford's career. Starring John Wayne and James Stewart, the supporting cast features leading lady Vera Miles, Edmond O'Brien as a loquacious newspaper publisher, Andy Devine as the inept marshal Appleyard, Denver Pyle, John Carradine, and Lee Marvin in a major role as the brutal Valance, with Lee Van Cleef and Strother Martin as his henchmen. It is also notable as the film in which Wayne most often used his trademark phrase "Pilgrim" (his nickname for James Stewart's character). The picture was very successful, grossing over $3 million in its first year, although the lead casting stretched credibility—the characters played by Stewart (then 53) and Wayne (then 54) could be assumed to be in their early 20s given the circumstances, and Ford reportedly considered casting a younger actor in Stewart's role but feared it would highlight Wayne's age. Though it is often claimed that budget constraints necessitated shooting most of the film on soundstages on the Paramount lot, studio accounting records show that this was part of the film's original artistic concept, according to Ford biographer Joseph McBride. According to Lee Marvin in a filmed interview, Ford had fought hard to shoot the film in black-and-white to accentuate his use of shadows. Still, it was one of Ford's most expensive films at US$3.2 million.

After completing Liberty Valance, Ford was hired to direct the Civil War section of MGM's epic How The West Was Won, the first non-documentary film to use the Cinerama wide-screen process. Ford's segment featured George Peppard, with Andy Devine, Russ Tamblyn, Harry Morgan as Ulysses S. Grant, and John Wayne as William Tecumseh Sherman. Wayne had already played Sherman in a 1960 episode of the television series Wagon Train that Ford directed in support of series star Ward Bond, "The Coulter Craven Story", for which he brought in most of his stock company. Also in 1962, Ford directed his fourth and last TV production, Flashing Spikes, a baseball story made for the Alcoa Premiere series and starring James Stewart, Jack Warden, Patrick Wayne and Tige Andrews, with Harry Carey Jr. and a lengthy surprise appearance by John Wayne, billed in the credits as "Michael Morris", as he also had been for the Wagon Train episode directed by Ford.

Donovan's Reef (Paramount, 1963) was Ford's last film with John Wayne. Filmed on location on the Hawaiian island of Kauai (doubling for a fictional island in French Polynesia), it was a morality play disguised as an action-comedy, which subtly but sharply engaged with issues of racial bigotry, corporate connivance, greed and American beliefs of societal superiority. The supporting cast included Lee Marvin, Elizabeth Allen, Jack Warden, Dorothy Lamour, and Cesar Romero. It was also Ford's last commercial success, grossing $3.3 million against a budget of $2.6 million.

Cheyenne Autumn (Warner Bros, 1964) was Ford's epic farewell to the West, which he publicly declared to be an elegy to the Native American. It was his last Western, his longest film and the most expensive movie of his career ($4.2 million), but it failed to recoup its costs at the box office and lost about $1 million on its first release. The all-star cast was headed by Richard Widmark, with Carroll Baker, Karl Malden, Dolores del Río, Ricardo Montalbán, Gilbert Roland, Sal Mineo, James Stewart as Wyatt Earp, Arthur Kennedy as Doc Holliday, Edward G. Robinson, Patrick Wayne, Elizabeth Allen, Mike Mazurki and many of Ford's faithful Stock Company, including John Carradine, Ken Curtis, Willis Bouchey, James Flavin, Danny Borzage, Harry Carey Jr., Chuck Hayward, Ben Johnson, Mae Marsh and Denver Pyle. William Clothier was nominated for a Best Cinematography Oscar and Gilbert Roland was nominated for a Golden Globe award for Best Supporting Actor for his performance as Cheyenne elder Dull Knife.

In 1965 Ford began work on Young Cassidy (MGM), a biographical drama based upon the life of Irish playwright Seán O'Casey, but he fell ill early in the production and was replaced by Jack Cardiff.

Ford's last completed feature film was 7 Women (MGM, 1966), a drama set in about 1935, about missionary women in China trying to protect themselves from the advances of a barbaric Mongolian warlord. Anne Bancroft took over the lead role from Patricia Neal, who suffered a near-fatal stroke two days into shooting. The supporting cast included Margaret Leighton, Flora Robson, Sue Lyon, Mildred Dunnock, Anna Lee, Eddie Albert, Mike Mazurki and Woody Strode, with music by Elmer Bernstein. Unfortunately, it was a commercial flop, grossing only about half of its $2.3 million budget. Unusual for Ford, it was shot in continuity for the sake of the performances and he, therefore, exposed about four times as much film as he usually shot. Anna Lee recalled that Ford was "absolutely charming" to everyone and that the only major blow-up came when Flora Robson complained that the sign on her dressing room door did not include her title ("Dame") and as a result, Robson was "absolutely shredded" by Ford in front of the cast and crew.

Ford's next project, The Miracle of Merriford, was scrapped by MGM less than a week before shooting was to have begun. His last completed work was Chesty: A Tribute to a Legend, a documentary on the most decorated U.S. Marine, General Lewis B. Puller, with narration by John Wayne, which was made in 1970 but not released until 1976, three years after Ford's death.

Ford's health deteriorated rapidly in the early 1970s; he suffered a broken hip in 1970 which put him in a wheelchair. He had to move from his Bel Air home to a single-level house in Palm Desert, California, near Eisenhower Medical Center, where he was being treated for stomach cancer. The Screen Directors Guild staged a tribute to Ford in October 1972, and in March 1973 the American Film Institute honored him with its first Lifetime Achievement Award at a ceremony which was telecast nationwide, with President Richard Nixon promoting Ford to full Admiral and presenting him with the Presidential Medal of Freedom.

According to Ford's longtime partner and friend, John Wayne, Ford could have continued to direct movies. He told Roger Ebert in 1976:

Up until the very last years of his life ... Pappy could have directed another picture, and a damned good one. But they said Pappy was too old. Hell, he was never too old. In Hollywood these days, they don't stand behind a fella. They'd rather make a goddamned legend out of him and be done with him.

Ford died on August 31, 1973, at Palm Desert and his funeral was held on September 5 at Hollywood's Church of the Blessed Sacrament. He was interred in Holy Cross Cemetery in Culver City, California.

== Personality and directing style ==
=== Personality ===
Ford was a forceful personality with many idiosyncrasies and eccentricities. Beginning in the 1930s, he often wore dark glasses or a patch over his left eye, which was sensitive to light. He was an inveterate pipe-smoker and while he was shooting he would chew on a linen handkerchief—each morning his wife would give him a dozen fresh handkerchiefs, but by the end of a day's filming the corners of all of them would be chewed to shreds. He always had music played on the set and would routinely break for tea (Earl Grey) at mid-afternoon every day during filming. He discouraged chatter and disliked swearing on set; its use, especially in front of a woman, would typically result in the offender being thrown off the production. He rarely drank during the making of a film, but when a production wrapped he would often lock himself in his study, wrapped only in a sheet, and go on a solitary drinking binge for several days, followed by routine contrition and a vow never to drink again. He was extremely sensitive to criticism and was always particularly angered by any comparison between his work and that of his elder brother Francis. He rarely attended premieres or award ceremonies, although his Oscars and other awards were proudly displayed on the mantel in his home.

There were occasional rumors about his sexual preferences. In her 2004 autobiography 'Tis Herself, Maureen O'Hara recalled seeing Ford kissing a famous male actor (whom she did not name) in his office at Columbia Studios.

He was untidy, and his study was always littered with books, papers, and clothes. He bought a brand new Rolls-Royce in the 1930s, but never rode in it because his wife, Mary, would not let him smoke in it. His own car, a battered Ford roadster, was so dilapidated and messy that he was once late for a studio meeting because the guard at the studio gate did not believe that the real John Ford would drive such a car, and refused to let him in.

Ford held antipathy towards studio executives. On one early film for Fox he is said to have ordered a guard to keep studio boss Darryl F. Zanuck off the set, and on another occasion, he brought an executive in front of the crew, stood him in profile and announced, "This is an associate producer—take a good look, because you won't be seeing him on this picture again". While shooting Rio Grande in 1950, producer Herbert Yates and Republic executive Rudy Ralston visited the location and when Yates pointed out the time (it was 10am) and asked when Ford intended to start shooting, Ford barked, "Just as soon as you get the hell off my set!" At dinner, Ford reportedly recruited cast member Alberto Morin to masquerade as an inept French waiter, who proceeded to spill soup over them, break plates and cause general mayhem, but the two executives apparently did not realize they were the victims of one of Ford's practical jokes.

He greatly enjoyed spending time on his yacht, Araner, which he bought in 1934 and on which he lavished hundreds of thousands of dollars in repairs and improvements over the years; it became his chief retreat between films and a meeting place for his circle of close friends, including John Wayne and Ward Bond.

Ford was highly intelligent, erudite, sensitive and sentimental, but to protect himself in the cutthroat atmosphere of Hollywood he cultivated the image of a "tough, two-fisted, hard-drinking Irish sonofabitch". One famous event, witnessed by Ford's friend, actor Frank Baker, strikingly illustrates the tension between the public persona and the private man. During the Depression, Ford—by then a very wealthy man—was accosted outside his office by a former Universal actor who was destitute and needed $200 for an operation for his wife. As the man related his misfortunes, Ford appeared to become enraged and then, to the horror of onlookers, he launched himself at the man, knocked him to the floor and shouted "How dare you come here like this? Who do you think you are to talk to me this way?" before storming out of the room. However, as the shaken old man left the building, Frank Baker saw Ford's business manager Fred Totman meet him at the door, where he handed the man a cheque for $1,000 and instructed Ford's chauffeur to drive him home. There, an ambulance was waiting to take the man's wife to the hospital where a specialist, flown in from San Francisco at Ford's expense, performed the operation. Sometime later, Ford purchased a house for the couple and pensioned them for life. When Baker related the story to Francis Ford, he declared that the incident illustrated his brother's personality very well:

Any moment, if that old actor had kept talking, people would have realized what a softy Jack is. He couldn't have stood through that sad story without breaking down. He's built this whole legend of toughness around himself to protect his softness.

In the book Wayne and Ford, The Films, the Friendship, and the Forging of an American Hero by Nancy Schoenberger, the author dissects the cultural impact of the masculinity portrayed in Ford's films. In an interview with Portland Magazine, Schoenberger states, "Regarding Ford and Wayne "tweaking the conventions of what a 'man' is today," I think Ford, having grown up with brothers he idolized, in a rough-and-tumble world of boxers, drinkers, and roustabouts, found his deepest theme in male camaraderie, especially in the military, one of the few places where men can express their love for other men. But he was concerned with men acting heroically, thus the most macho guy was not always the most heroic. McLaglen often presented the comic side of blustery masculinity. Ford brought out Wayne's tenderness as well as his toughness, especially in Stagecoach."

=== General style ===
Ford had many distinctive stylistic trademarks and a suite of thematic preoccupations and visual and aural motifs recurs throughout his work as a director. Film journalist Ephraim Katz summarized some of the keynote features of Ford's work in his Collins Film Encyclopedia entry:

Of all American directors, Ford probably had the clearest personal vision and the most consistent visual style. His ideas and his characters are, like many things branded "American", deceptively simple. His heroes ... may appear simply to be loners, outsiders to established society, who generally speak through action rather than words. But their conflict with society embodies larger themes in the American experience.

Ford's films, particularly the Westerns, express a deep aesthetic sensibility for the American past and the spirit of the frontier ... his compositions have a classic strength in which masses of people and their natural surroundings are beautifully juxtaposed, often in breathtaking long shots. The movement of men and horses in his Westerns has rarely been surpassed for regal serenity and evocative power. The musical score, often variations on folk themes, plays a more important part than dialogue in many Ford films.

Ford also championed the value and force of the group, as evidenced in his many military dramas ... [he] expressed a similar sentiment for camaraderie through his repeated use of certain actors in the lead and supporting roles ... he also felt an allegiance to places ...

In contrast to his contemporary Alfred Hitchcock, Ford never used storyboards, composing his pictures entirely in his head, without any written or graphic outline of the shots he would use. Script development could be intense but, once approved, his screenplays were rarely rewritten; he was also one of the first filmmakers to encourage his writers and actors to prepare a full back story for their characters. He hated long expository scenes and was famous for tearing pages out of a script to cut dialogue. During the making of Mogambo, when challenged by the film's producer Sam Zimbalist about falling three days behind schedule, Ford responded by tearing three pages out of the script and declaring "We're on schedule" and indeed he never filmed those pages. While making Drums Along the Mohawk, Ford neatly sidestepped the challenge of shooting a large and expensive battle scene—he had Henry Fonda improvise a monologue while firing questions from behind the camera about the course of the battle (a subject on which Fonda was well-versed) and then simply editing out the questions.

He was relatively sparing in his use of camera movements and close-ups, preferring static medium or long shots, with his players framed against dramatic vistas or interiors lit in an Expressionistic style, although he often used panning shots and sometimes used a dramatic dolly in (e.g. John Wayne's first appearance in Stagecoach). Ford is famous for his exciting tracking shots, such as the Apache chase sequence in Stagecoach or the attack on the Comanche camp in The Searchers.

Recurring visual motifs include trains and wagons—many Ford films begin and end with a linking vehicle such as a train or wagon arriving and leaving—doorways, roads, flowers, rivers, gatherings (parades, dances, meetings, bar scenes, etc.); he also employed gestural motifs in many films, notably the throwing of objects and the lighting of lamps, matches or cigarettes. If a doomed character was shown playing poker (such as Liberty Valance or gunman Tom Tyler in Stagecoach), the last hand he plays is the "death hand"—two eights and two aces, one of them the ace of spades—so-called because Wild Bill Hickok is said to have held this hand when he was murdered. Many of his sound films include renditions or quotations of his favorite hymn, "Shall We Gather at the River?", such as its parodic use to underscore the opening scenes of Stagecoach, when the prostitute Dallas is being run out of town by local matrons. Character names also recur in many Ford films—the name Quincannon, for example, is used in several films including The Lost Patrol, Rio Grande, She Wore A Yellow Ribbon and Fort Apache, John Wayne's character is named "Kirby Yorke" in both Fort Apache and Rio Grande, and the names Tyree and Boone are also recur in several Ford films.

Recent works about Ford's depictions of Native Americans have argued that contrary to popular belief, his Indian characters spanned a range of hostile to sympathetic images from The Iron Horse to Cheyenne Autumn. His depiction of the Navajo in Wagon Master included their characters speaking the Navajo language. The distinguishing mark of Ford's Indian-themed Westerns is that his Native characters always remained separate and apart from white society.

Ford was legendary for his discipline and efficiency on-set. He was extremely tough on actors, frequently mocking, yelling and bullying them; he was also infamous for his sometimes sadistic practical jokes. Any actor foolish enough to demand star treatment would receive the full force of his relentless scorn and sarcasm. He once referred to John Wayne as a "big idiot" and even punched Henry Fonda. Henry Brandon (who played Chief Scar from The Searchers) once referred to Ford as "the only man who could make John Wayne cry".. He likewise belittled Victor McLaglen, on one occasion reportedly bellowing through the megaphone: "D'ya know, McLaglen, that Fox are paying you $1200 a week to do things that I could get any child off the street to do better?". Stock Company veteran Ward Bond was reportedly one of the few actors who were impervious to Ford's taunting and sarcasms. Sir Donald Sinden, then a contract star for the Rank Organisation at Pinewood Studios when he starred in Mogambo, was not the only person to suffer at the hands of John Ford's notorious behaviour. He recalls "Ten White Hunters were seconded to our unit for our protection and to provide fresh meat. Among them was Marcus, Lord Wallscourt, a delightful man whom Ford treated abysmally—sometimes very sadistically. In Ford's eyes the poor man could do nothing right and was continually being bawled out in front of the entire unit (in some ways he occasionally took the heat off me). None of us could understand the reason for this appalling treatment, which the dear kind man in no way deserved. He himself was quite at a loss. Several weeks later we discovered the cause from Ford's brother-in-law: before emigrating to America, Ford's grandfather had been a labourer on the estate in Ireland of the then Lord Wallscourt: Ford was now getting his own back at his descendant. Not a charming sight." "We now had to return to the MGM-British Studios in London to shoot all the interior scenes. Someone must have pointed out to Ford that he had been thoroughly foul to me during the entire location shoot and when I arrived for my first day's work, I found that he had caused a large notice to be painted at the entrance to our sound stage in capital letters reading BE KIND TO DONALD WEEK. He was as good as his word—for precisely seven days. On the eighth day he ripped the sign down and returned to his normal bullying behaviour."

Ford usually gave his actors little explicit direction, although on occasion he would casually walk through a scene himself, and actors were expected to note every subtle action or mannerism; if they did not, Ford would make them repeat the scene until they got it right, and he would often berate and belittle those who failed to achieve his desired performance. On The Man Who Shot Liberty Valance, Ford ran through a scene with Edmond O'Brien and ended by drooping his hand over a railing. O'Brien noticed this but deliberately ignored it, placing his hand on the railing instead; Ford would not explicitly correct him and he reportedly made O'Brien play the scene forty-two times before the actor relented and did it Ford's way.

Despite his often difficult and demanding personality, many actors who worked with Ford acknowledged that he brought out the best in them. John Wayne remarked that "Nobody could handle actors and crew like Jack." Dobe Carey stated that "He had a quality that made everyone almost kill themselves to please him. Upon arriving on the set, you would feel right away that something special was going to happen. You would feel spiritually awakened all of a sudden." Carey credits Ford with the inspiration of Carey's final film, Comanche Stallion (2005).

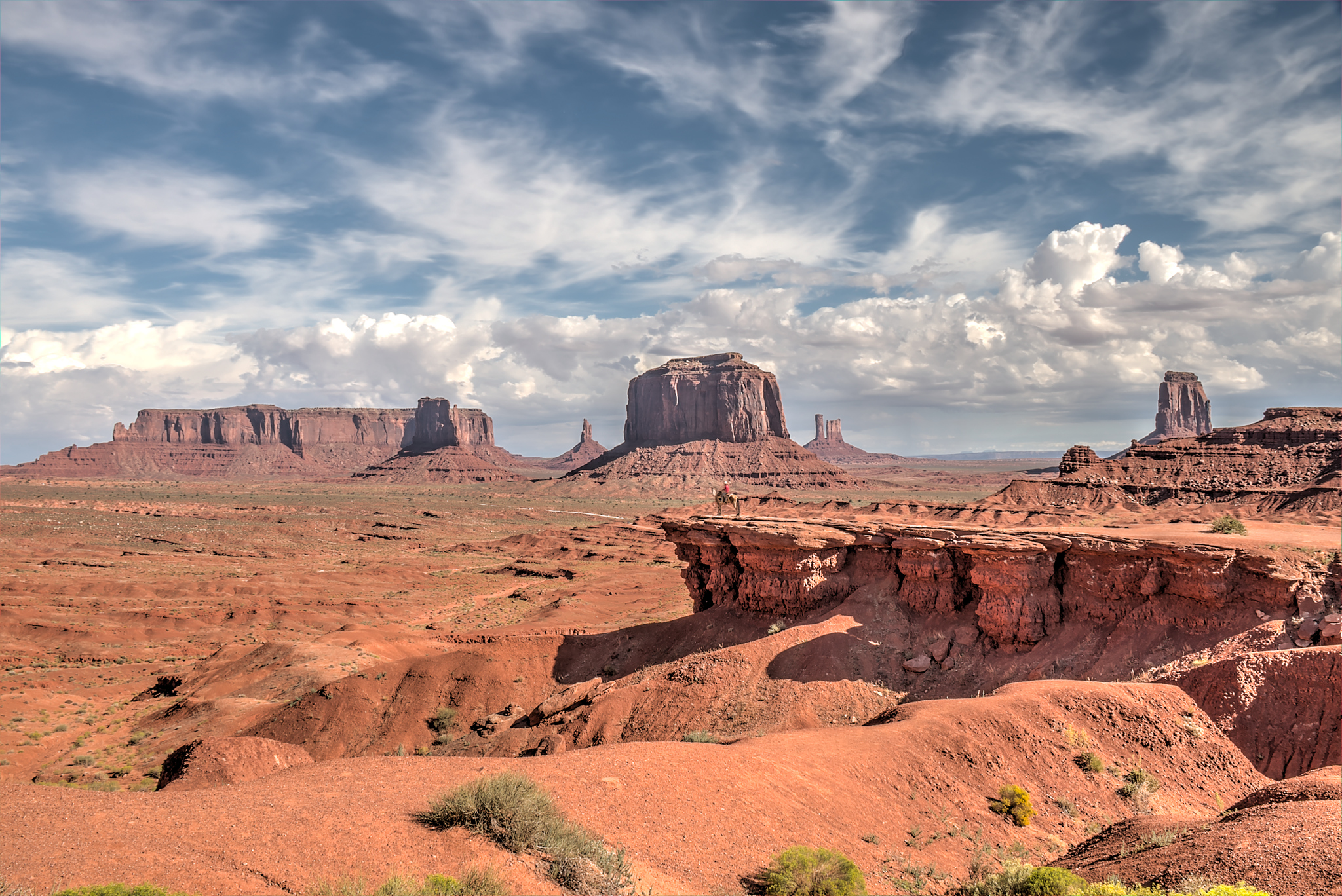
John Ford's Point in Monument Valley

Ford's most known location for his Western films was southern Utah's Monument Valley. Although not generally appropriate geographically as a setting for his plots, the expressive visual impact of the area enabled Ford to define images of the American West in such films as Stagecoach, The Searchers, and Fort Apache. A notable example is the famous scene in She Wore a Yellow Ribbon in which the cavalry troop is photographed against an oncoming storm. The influence on the films of classic Western artists such as Frederic Remington and others has been examined. Ford's use of the territory for his Westerns has defined the images of the American West so powerfully that Orson Welles once said that other film makers refused to shoot in the region out of fears of plagiarism.

Ford typically shot only the footage he needed and often filmed in sequence, minimizing the job of his film editors. In the opinion of Joseph McBride, Ford's technique of cutting in the camera enabled him to retain creative control in a period where directors often had little say on the final editing of their films. Ford noted:

I don't give 'em a lot of film to play with. In fact, Eastman used to complain that I exposed so little film. I do cut in the camera. Otherwise, if you give them a lot of film 'the committee' takes over. They start juggling scenes around and taking out this and putting in that. They can't do it with my pictures. I cut in the camera and that's it. There's not a lot of film left on the floor when I'm finished.

Ford hated the zoom lens and as a rule wouldn't allow them on his sets nor camera cranes. However, his last film, Chesty: A Tribute to a Legend, features a zoom shot.

== Awards and honors ==
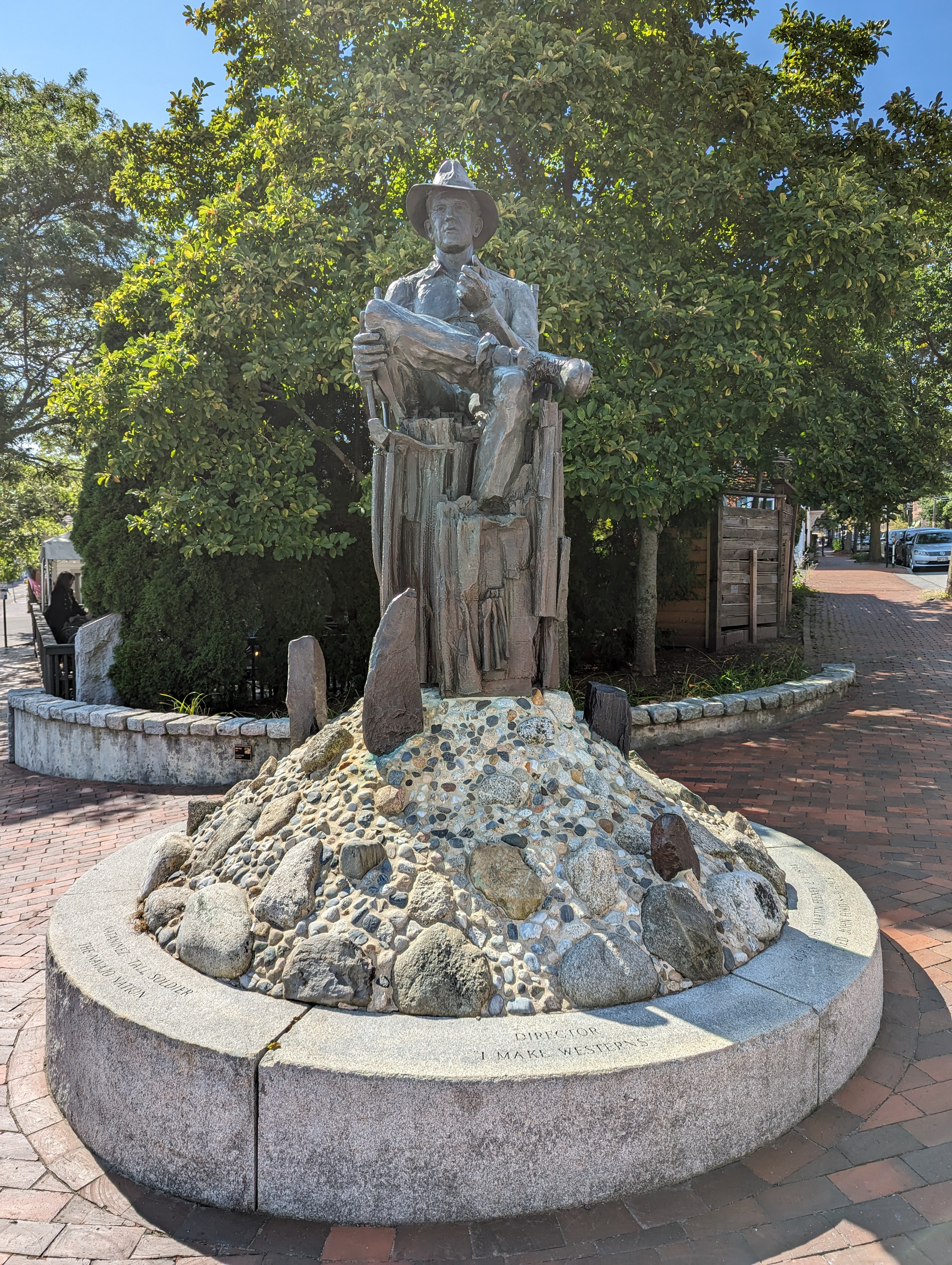
John Ford Statue at Gorham's Corner in Portland, Maine

Ford won a total of four Academy Awards with all of them being for Best Director, for the films The Informer (1935), The Grapes of Wrath (1940), How Green Was My Valley (1941), and The Quiet Man (1952)—none of them Westerns (also starring in the last two was Maureen O'Hara, "his favorite actress"). He was also nominated as Best Director for Stagecoach (1939). He later directed two documentaries, The Battle of Midway and December 7, which both won Best Documentary, although the award was not won by him. To this day Ford holds the record for winning the most Best Director Oscars, having won the award on four occasions. William Wyler and Frank Capra come in second having won the award three times. Ford was the first director to win consecutive Best Director awards, in 1940 and 1941. This feat was later matched by Joseph L. Mankiewicz exactly ten years later, when he won consecutive awards for Best Director in 1950 and 1951. As a producer, he also received a nomination for Best Picture for The Quiet Man. In 1955 and 1957, Ford was awarded the George Eastman Award given by George Eastman House for distinguished contribution to the art of film. He was the first recipient of the American Film Institute Life Achievement Award in 1973. Also in that year, Ford was awarded the Presidential Medal of Freedom by President Richard Nixon.

Ford directed 10 different actors in Oscar-nominated performances: Victor McLaglen, Thomas Mitchell, Edna May Oliver, Jane Darwell, Henry Fonda, Donald Crisp, Sara Allgood, Ava Gardner, Grace Kelly and Jack Lemmon. McLaglen, Mitchell, Darwell, Crisp and Lemmon won an Oscar for one of their roles in one of Ford's movies.

In 1998, a statue of Ford was unveiled in Portland, Maine, across the street from where his father once owned a pub. Sculpted by artist George Kelly, the statue is surrounded by a memorial containing facts about Ford's life and his films.

A television special featuring Ford, John Wayne, James Stewart, and Henry Fonda was broadcast over the CBS network on December 5, 1971, called The American West of John Ford, featuring clips from Ford's career interspersed with interviews conducted by Wayne, Stewart, and Fonda, who also took turns narrating the hour-long documentary.

In 2007, Twentieth Century Fox released Ford at Fox, a DVD boxed set of 24 of Ford's films. Time magazine's Richard Corliss named it one of the "Top 10 DVDs of 2007", ranking it at No. 1.

In 2019 Jean-Christophe Klotz released the documentary film John Ford, l'homme qui inventa l'Amérique ("the man who invented America"), about his influence in the legend of the American West in films like Stagecoach (1939), The Grapes of Wrath (1940), The Man Who Shot Liberty Valance (1962) and Cheyenne Autumn (1964).

== Preservation ==
The Academy Film Archive has preserved a number of John Ford's films, including How Green Was My Valley, The Battle of Midway, Drums Along the Mohawk, Sex Hygiene, Torpedo Squadron 8, and Four Sons.

As of 2024, eleven films directed or co-directed by Ford have been added to the National Film Registry, tying with Howard Hawks for the most.

=== Academy Awards ===
Year	Category	Work	Result
1935	Best Director	The Informer	Won
1939	Best Director	Stagecoach	Nominated
1940	Best Director	The Grapes of Wrath	Won
1941	Best Director	How Green Was My Valley	Won
1952	Best Director	The Quiet Man	Won
1952	Best Picture	The Quiet Man	Nominated

Accolades for Ford's features
Year	Title	Oscars		BAFTAs		Golden Globes	
Year	Title	Nominations	Wins	nominations	Wins	Nominations	Wins
1931	Arrowsmith	4					
1934	The Lost Patrol	1					
1935	The Informer	6	4				
1937	Wee Willie Winkie	1					
1937	The Hurricane	3	1				
1939	Stagecoach	7	1				
1939	Young Mr. Lincoln	1					
1939	Drums Along the Mohawk	1					
1940	The Grapes of Wrath	7	2				
1940	The Long Voyage Home	6					
1941	How Green Was My Valley	10	5				
1942	The Battle of Midway	1	1				
1943	December 7th: The Movie	1	1				
1945	They Were Expendable	2					
1949	She Wore a Yellow Ribbon	1	1				
1950	When Willie Comes Marching Home	1				1	
1952	The Quiet Man	7	2			2	
1953	The Sun Shines Bright			1			
1953	Mogambo	2		1		1	1
1955	Mister Roberts	3	1	1			
1956	The Searchers					1	1
1958	The Last Hurrah			1			
1962	The Man Who Shot Liberty Valance	1					
1962	How the West Was Won	8	3				
1964	Cheyenne Autumn	1				1	
Total		75	22	4	0	6	2

=== Directed Academy Award performances ===
Year	Performer	Film	Winner
Academy Award for Best Actor
1935	Victor McLaglen	The Informer	Won
1940	Henry Fonda	The Grapes of Wrath	Nominated
Academy Award for Best Actress
1953	Ava Gardner	Mogambo	Nominated
Academy Award for Best Supporting Actor
1937	Thomas Mitchell	The Hurricane	Nominated
1939	Thomas Mitchell	Stagecoach	Won
1941	Donald Crisp	How Green Was My Valley	Won
1952	Victor McLaglen	The Quiet Man	Nominated
1955	Jack Lemmon	Mister Roberts	Won
Academy Award for Best Supporting Actress
1939	Edna May Oliver	Drums Along the Mohawk	Nominated
1940	Jane Darwell	The Grapes of Wrath	Won
1941	Sara Allgood	How Green Was My Valley	Nominated
1953	Grace Kelly	Mogambo	Nominated

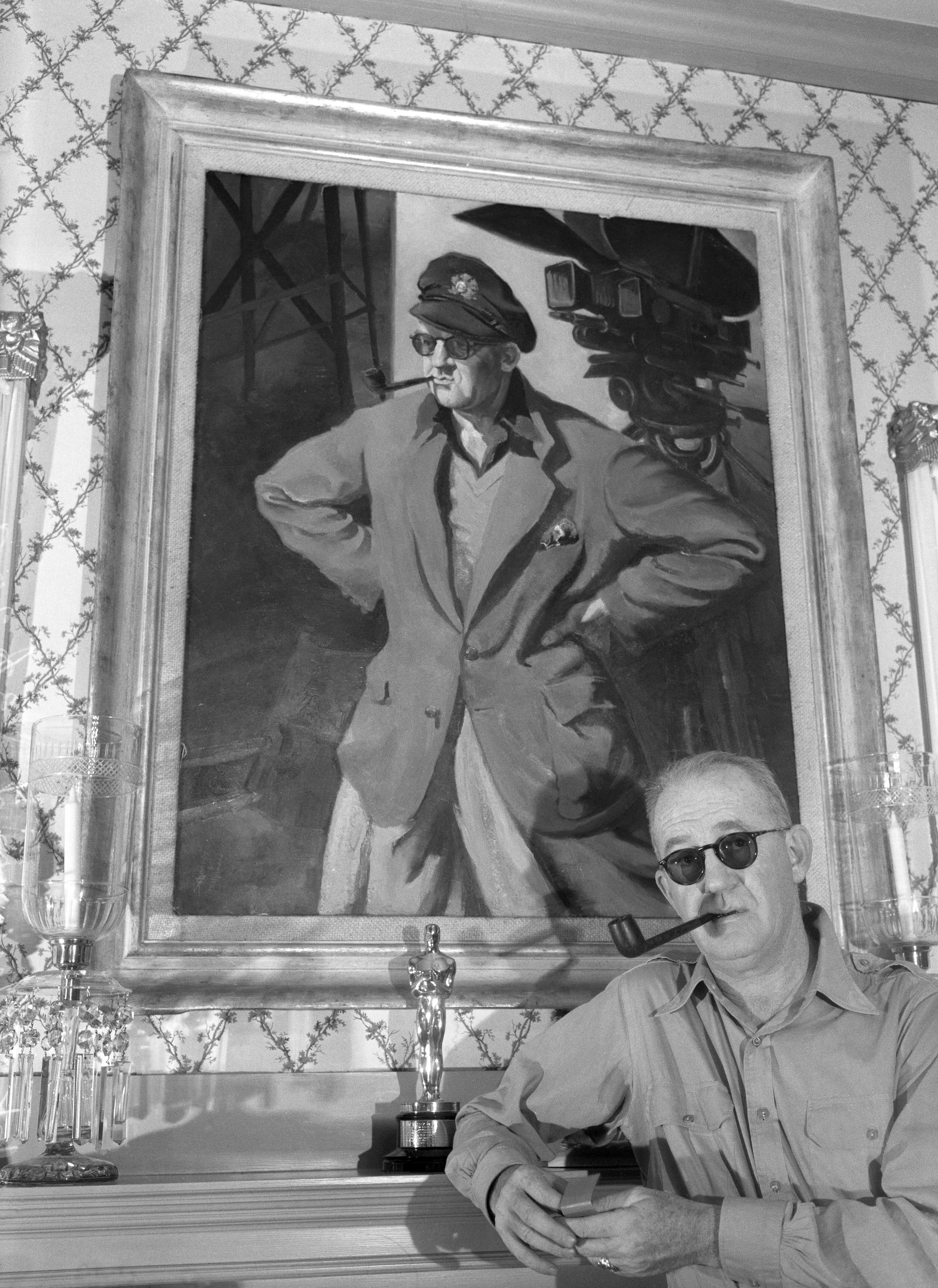
John Ford with portrait and Oscar, circa 1946

== Politics ==
Early in life, Ford's politics were conventionally progressive; his favorite presidents were Democrats Franklin D. Roosevelt, John F. Kennedy and Republican Abraham Lincoln. But despite these leanings, many thought he was a Republican because of his long association with actors John Wayne, James Stewart, Maureen O'Hara, and Ward Bond.

Ford's attitude to McCarthyism in Hollywood is expressed by a story told by Joseph L. Mankiewicz. A faction of the Directors Guild of America, led by Cecil B. DeMille, had tried to make it mandatory for every member to sign a loyalty oath. A whispering campaign was being conducted against Mankiewicz, then President of the Guild, alleging he had Communist sympathies. At a crucial meeting of the Guild, DeMille's faction spoke for four hours until Ford spoke against DeMille and proposed a vote of confidence in Mankiewicz, which was passed. His words were recorded by a stenographer:

My name's John Ford. I make Westerns. I don't think there's anyone in this room who knows more about what the American public wants than Cecil B. DeMille—and he certainly knows how to give it to them ... [looking at DeMille] But I don't like you, C. B. I don't like what you stand for and I don't like what you've been saying here tonight.

Mankiewicz's version of events was contested in 2016, with the discovery of the court transcript, which was released as part of the Mankiewicz archives. Mankiewicz's account gives sole credit to Ford in sinking DeMille. The account has several embellishments. DeMille's move to fire Mankiewicz had caused a storm of protest. DeMille was basically on the receiving end of a torrent of attacks from many speakers throughout the meeting and at one point looked like being solely thrown off the guild board.

At this point, Ford rose to speak. His opening was that he rose in defense of the board. He claimed a personal role in a vote of confidence for Joseph Mankiewicz. He then called for an end to politics in the Guild and for it to refocus on working conditions. Ford told the meeting that the guild was formed to "protect ourselves against producers." Ford argued against "putting out derogatory information about a director, whether he is a Communist, beats his mother-in-law, or beats dogs." Ford wanted the debate and the meeting to end as his focus was the unity of the guild. He said that Mankiewicz had been vilified and deserved an apology. His final section was to support DeMille against further calls for his resignation. Ford's words about DeMille were, "And I think that some of the accusations made here tonight were pretty UnAmerican. I mean a group of men have picked on probably the dean of our profession. I don't agree with C. B. DeMille. I admire him. I don't like him, but I admire him. Everything he said tonight he had a right to say. I don't like to hear accusations against him." He concluded by "pleading" with the membership to retain DeMille.

Ford feared that DeMille's exit might have caused the body to disintegrate. His second move was to have the entire board resign, which saved face for DeMille and allowed the issue to be settled without forced resignations. The next day, Ford wrote a letter supporting DeMille and then telephoned, where Ford described DeMille as "a magnificent figure" so far above that "goddamn pack of rats."

At a heated and arduous meeting, Ford went to the defense of a colleague under sustained attack from his peers. He saw the dangers of expelling DeMille. Ford stared down the entire meeting to ensure that DeMille remained in the guild. He then later offered his own resignation—as part of the entire board—to ensure that the guild did not break and allowed DeMille to go without losing face.

Ford later became publicly allied with the Republican Party, declaring himself a "Maine Republican" in 1947. He said he voted for Barry Goldwater in the 1964 United States presidential election and supported Richard Nixon in 1968 and became a supporter of the Vietnam War. In 1973, he was awarded the Medal of Freedom by President Nixon, whose campaign he had publicly supported.

In 1952, Ford hoped for a Robert Taft/Douglas MacArthur Republican presidential ticket. When Dwight Eisenhower won the nomination, Ford wrote to Taft saying that like "a million other Americans, I am naturally bewildered and hurt by the outcome of the Republican Convention in Chicago."

In 1966, he supported Ronald Reagan in his governor's race and again for his reelection in 1970.

Ford scholar Tag Gallagher asserts that Ford was "essentially apolitical", although he also notes that the director became an ardent supporter of the Irish Republican Army after his first visit to Ireland in the 1920s, and that he channelled funds to the IRA for the rest of his career.

== Influence ==
Ford is widely considered to be among the most influential of Hollywood's filmmakers. He was listed as the sixth most influential director of all time by Flickside. Below are some of the people who were directly influenced by Ford, or greatly admired his work:

- Georgy Avenarius – the film critic was a Soviet major in charge of UFA GmbH Babelsberg Studio in Soviet Berlin. He allowed Budd Schulberg and the men of the OSS Field Photographic Branch access to Nazi newsreels and propaganda upon learning that they worked for Ford.
- Ingmar Bergman – Said of Ford, "the best director in the world".
- Bahram Beyzai wrote a laudatory critical review of Ford's more famous films in 1961, which is anthologized in Massoud Farasati's 2014 collection of writings by and about Ford in Persian
- Peter Bogdanovich – Directed by John Ford (1971)
- Frank Capra – Referred to Ford as the "king of directors"
- Michael Cimino
- Pedro Costa – "It makes me dream and it makes me come back. I felt so right when I saw a film by John Ford and I was in front of those people. It was a dream thing. It was a real thing."
- Clint Eastwood
- Federico Fellini
- Jean-Luc Godard – Once compared the ending of The Searchers to "Ulysses being reunited with Telemachus"
- Howard Hawks
- Alfred Hitchcock – "A John Ford film was a visual gratification"
- Elia Kazan
- Satoshi Kon took inspiration from Ford's 3 Godfathers for his animated film Tokyo Godfathers, a riff on Ford's western, set in contemporary Tokyo.
- Stanley Kubrick
- Akira Kurosawa – "I have respected John Ford from the beginning. Needless to say, I pay close attention to his productions, and I think I am influenced by them."
- David Lean took inspiration from The Searchers for his film Lawrence of Arabia
- Sergio Leone
- George Lucas
- John Milius
- Sam Peckinpah
- Satyajit Ray – "A hallmark is never easy to describe, but the nearest description of Ford's would be a combination of strength and simplicity. The nearest equivalent I can think of is a musical one: middle-period Beethoven."
- Jean Renoir – After seeing The Informer, he reportedly told George Seaton: "I learned so much today ... I learned how to not move my camera."
- Martin Scorsese
- Steven Spielberg – Once encountered Ford on a studio lot in the 1960s, an event he dramatized in the 2022 film The Fabelmans, with David Lynch as Ford and Gabriel LaBelle as Sammy Fabelman, a character loosely based on Spielberg who meets Ford during the final scene.
- Jean-Marie Straub praised Ford as "the most Brechtian of all filmmakers"
- Bertrand Tavernier
- Andrei Tarkovsky cited Ford as one of his favorite film directors in an interview with critic Kazuo Yamada.
- François Truffaut
- John Wayne
- Orson Welles – When asked to name the directors who most appealed to him, he replied: "I like the old masters, by which I mean John Ford, John Ford and John Ford."
- Wim Wenders

== Awards (military and civil) ==
Ford was awarded the Legion of Merit with Combat "V", a Purple Heart, the Meritorious Service Medal, the Air Medal, the Navy and Marine Corps Commendation Medal with Combat "V", the Navy Combat Action Ribbon the Presidential Medal of Freedom, the China Service Medal the American Defense Service Medal with service star, the American Campaign Medal, the European-African-Middle Eastern Campaign Medal with three campaign stars, the Asiatic–Pacific Campaign Medal also with three campaign stars, the World War II Victory Medal, the Navy Occupation Service Medal, the National Defense Service Medal with service star, the Korean Service Medal with one campaign star, the Naval Reserve Medal, the Order of National Security Merit Samil Medal, the United Nations Korea Medal, the Distinguished Pistol Shot Ribbon (1952–1959), and the Belgian Order of Leopold.

1st Row	Legion of Merit with Combat "V"			
2nd Row	Purple Heart	Meritorious Service Medal	Air Medal	Navy and Marine Corps Commendation Medal with Combat "V"
3rd Row	Navy Combat Action Ribbon	Presidential Medal of Freedom	China Service Medal	American Defense Service Medal
4th Row	American Campaign Medal	European-African-Middle Eastern Campaign Medal	Asiatic–Pacific Campaign Medal	World War II Victory Medal
5th Row	Navy Occupation Service Medal	National Defense Service Medal	Korean Service Medal	Naval Reserve Medal
6th Row	Order of National Security Merit Samil Medal	United Nations Korea Medal	Distinguished Pistol Shot Ribbon (1952–1959)	Order of Leopold (Belgium)

== See also ==
- List of film collaborations

Awards and achievements
Academy Awards
Preceded by Frank Capra for It Happened One Night	Best Director; John Ford; 1935 for The Informer	Succeeded by Frank Capra for Mr. Deeds Goes to Town
Academy Awards
Preceded by Victor Fleming for Gone with the Wind	Best Director; John Ford; 1940 for The Grapes of Wrath; 1941 for How Green Was My Valley	Succeeded by William Wyler for Mrs. Miniver
Academy Awards
Preceded by George Stevens for A Place in the Sun	Best Director; John Ford; 1952 for The Quiet Man	Succeeded by Fred Zinnemann for From Here to Eternity
American Film Institute
Preceded by Ford first recipient	AFI Life Achievement Award; John Ford; 1973	Succeeded by James Cagney
