= The Nazi Plan =

1945 film by George Stevens

- Directed by: Ray Kellogg; George Stevens
- Written by: Budd Schulberg; Stuart Schulberg
- Narrated by: Reed Hadley
- Edited by: Robert Parrish; Robert Arlington Webb; John McLafferty; Joseph Zigman; Susie Shestopel
- Production company: 20th Century-Fox
- Distributed by: United States Counsel for the Prosecution of Axis Criminality
- Release date: 1945
- Running time: 192 minutes
- Countries: Germany; United States
- Languages: English (subtitles); German

The Nazi Plan is a 1945 documentary film, compiled from extensive footage of captured Nazi propaganda and newsreel image and sound recordings. It was produced and presented as evidence at the Nuremberg Trials for Hermann Göring and twenty other Nazi leaders.

== Background ==
The Nazi Plan was shown as evidence at the International Military Tribunal (IMT) in Nuremberg on December 11, 1945. It was compiled by Budd Schulberg and other military personnel, under the supervision of Navy Commander James B. Donovan. The compilers took pains to use only German source material, including official newsreels and other German films (1919–45). It was put together for the US Counsel for the Prosecution of Axis Criminality and the US Office of the Chief Counsel for War Crimes."

In the course of this work, Budd Schulberg apprehended Leni Riefenstahl at her country home in Kitzbühl, Austria, as a material witness, and took her to the Nuremberg editing room, so she could help Budd identify Nazi figures in her films and in other German film material his unit had captured. Stuart Schulberg [also] took possession of the photo archive of Heinrich Hoffmann, Hitler’s personal photographer, and became the film unit’s expert on still photo evidence. Most of the stills presented at the trial carry his affidavit of authenticity.

== Film content ==
The Nazi Plan (1945)

The film is divided into four parts:

1. The rise of the NSDAP, 1921 to 1933
2. Acquiring totalitarian control of Germany, 1933 to 1935
3. Preparation for wars of Aggression, 1935 to 1939
4. Wars of Aggression, 1939 to 1944
