= Georgy Avenarius =

Soviet film critic

Avenarius in 1956

Georgy Alexandrovich Avenarius (Russian: Георгий Александрович Авенариус; 1903–1958) was one of the founders of Soviet film criticism.

He was born in a family of intellectuals, and was interested in movie art from the early ages. Avenarius finished the Odessa Actor's studio, then acted in Ukrainian films like "Spartak" (1926), "Taras Tryasilo" (1926) etc. by Perestiani and Chardynin. In 1930, he finished the Odessa film college, worked as cameramen with Dovzhenko and taught courses in Soviet and foreign film history and theory at Kiev film-institute. Avenarius published his first film-analyses in "Radianskoe kino" and "Proletarskoe kino" journals in 1930's. In 1936, Sergei Eisenstein invited him to Moscow, to organize new courses of Foreign film history at VGIK all-Soviet institute. He also organized the foreign film collection at all-Soviet Fund of films. After World War II, he was the Soviet captain in charge of the former UFA GmbH Babelsberg Studio in Soviet Berlin. When Budd Schulberg and other operatives of the American OSS Field Photographic Branch asked him about the collection of Nazi newsreels and propaganda in order to document the prosecution in the Nuremberg Trials, Avenarius immediately allowed access upon learning that the head of the branch was his admired John Ford.

Avenarius is an author of many researches, monographs and textbooks. He was known as a specialist on Charles Chaplin's early period.

One of the central streets of the Domodedovsky District, where the Gosfilmofond is located, is named after Georgy Avenarius.
