= Johann Habermann =

German Lutheran theologian

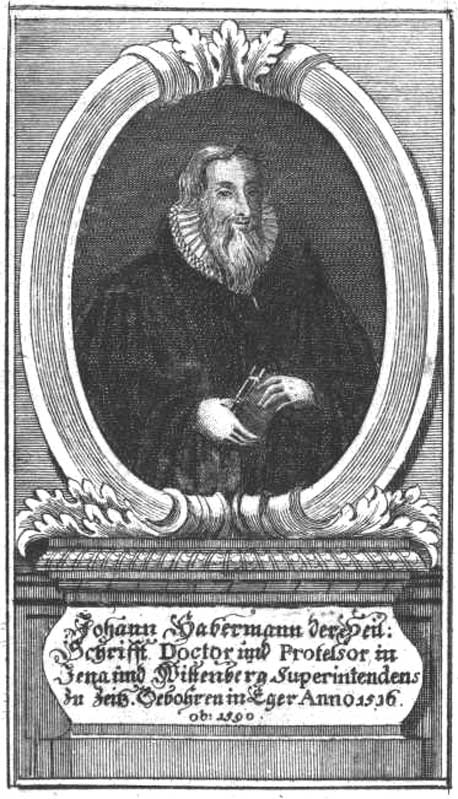
Johann Habermann.

Johann Habermann, also Johannes Avenarius (10 August 1516 – 5 December 1590) was a German Lutheran theologian.

== Life ==
He was born at Eger (92 m. w. of Prague) on 10 August 1516. He went over to the Lutheran Church about 1540, studied theology, and filled a number of pastorates. After a brief academic activity at Jena and Wittenberg, in 1575, he accepted a call as superintendent of Naumburg-Zeitz.

He died at Zeitz (23 m. s.w. of Leipzig) on 5 December 1590.

== Works ==
Though praised by his contemporaries as an Old Testament exegete, his significance lies in the practical field. He published a number of sermons, a Trostbüchlein, a life of Christ, and above all the prayer-book, Christliche Gebet für alle Not und Stende der gantzen Christenheit (1565, 2. edition 1567), in which, for the first time, the prayers for various Christian needs were apportioned among the several days of the week. With a few exceptions the prayers are written in plain Biblical language, without ornament. The work was translated into Latin, English (as The Enimie of Securitie, London, 1580), and French, and was widely circulated in Protestant circles. Despite its occasional crudities of expression the book is still used; and some of the prayers have passed into church books.
