= Oreskes =

Oreskes is a surname. Notable people with the surname include:

- Daniel Oreskes, American actor
- Michael Oreskes (born 1954), American journalist
- Naomi Oreskes (born 1958), American historian of science
