= Henry C. Rogers =

American publicist

- Born: Henry C. Rogers; April 19, 1914; Irvington, New Jersey, U.S.
- Died: April 28, 1995 (aged 81); Brentwood, Los Angeles, California, U.S.
- Education: Wharton School of Finance and Commerce at the University of Pennsylvania
- Occupation: Entertainment publicist

Henry C. Rogers (April 19, 1914 – April 28, 1995) was an American publicist in the entertainment industry. He worked with notable actors and singers, such as Rita Hayworth, Joan Crawford, Frank Sinatra, Shirley MacLaine, Dean Martin, Audrey Hepburn, Paul Newman, Steve McQueen, Paul McCartney, and many others. Rogers wrote four books, titled Walking the Tightrope: the private confessions of a public relations man, Rogers' Rules for Success, The One-Hat Solution: Rogers' Strategy for Creative Middle Management, and Rogers' Rules for Businesswomen: How to Start a Career and Move Up the Ladder.

== Personal life ==
=== Early life ===
Henry Rogers was born in Irvington, New Jersey, where his father operated a dry goods store. He was of Jewish heritage. He attended the Wharton School of Finance and Commerce at the University of Pennsylvania, but when his father's store began to fail during the Depression, he had to drop out of school two and a half years into his program. It was January 1934 that he left Penn and enrolled in classes at New York University School of Commerce. Rogers worked 5 days a week at the store, and took classes in the evening. The summer of 1934 his family went bankrupt. On October 1, 1934, they left for Los Angeles, California to join his older sister who had moved with her lawyer husband two years before.

=== Late life ===
In 1937, he married Rosalind Jaffe (niece of Adeline Schulberg and Sam Jaffe); they had one son, Ron, and one daughter, Marcia Ross. Rogers died on April 28, 1995, due to a combination of longstanding heart and kidney problems. At that point, he had worked in the public relations business for 50 years.

=== Philanthropy ===
In promoting the arts, Rogers served as chairman of the Center Theatre Group and was a board member of the Performing Arts Council of the Los Angeles County Music Center, the Los Angeles County Museum of Art and the American Council for the Arts. He was a vice chairman of the American Film Institute and chairman of an advisory committee to the U.S. Information Agency. He also served on the board of the Los Angeles Area Chamber of Commerce.

== Career ==
=== Early career ===
After much trouble finding work, Rogers began his career in 1934 as a $5-a-week press agent's office boy for Grace Nolan, a Hollywood press agent. After working for Nolan for a while, Rogers was promoted to $12 an hour. It was then that he began meeting people in the movie business. Rogers was fired after accidentally taking home his boss' keys and causing her to miss an appointment.

When the job ended, Rogers, then 21, borrowed $500 from his father to set up his own business in 1935. His first clients were nightclubs and restaurants, which paid little but enabled him to tell the columnists which stars had been seen on the premises. It helped the clients; it also got Rogers better known.

=== Rogers and Cowan ===
Henry Rogers founded his own independent public relations firm in 1935. In 1950, 15 years into the business, he partnered with Warren Cowan and changed the name of the firm to Rogers and Cowan. Rogers and Cowan then became the twelfth-largest public relations firm in the United States… Headquartered in Beverly Hills, also offices in New York and London.

Crediting him with being the founder of modern-day publicity, The New York Times wrote, "Henry C. Rogers transformed the seedy world of the Hollywood press agent into a plush-carpet profession. Rogers was known as the man who elevated industry ethical standards, particularly through his insistence that public relations professionals had as much responsibility to the news media as they did to their clients." Cowan was the idea man, recruiting and working closely with individuals and for events. He created 1945 Oscar campaign during which he turned Joan Crawford from “box office poison” to an Oscar winner for best actress in a leading role for her performance in Mildred Pierce. The NY Times wrote, “Mr. Rogers, who was credited with making Rita Hayworth a household name and with creating the sweeping publicity campaigns that have become a fixture of the annual quest for Academy Awards, became almost as well known in Hollywood as the famous clients” who included Audrey Hepburn, Lucille Ball, Paul Newman, Frank Sinatra, Cary Grant, Gregory Peck, Danny Kaye, Rex Harrison, Gary Cooper, Kirk Douglas, Liz Taylor, Shirley MacLaine, Olivia de Havilland, Jane Wyatt and Jane Wyman. He later expanded into international and corporate PR, representing Fortune 500 companies and working as Prince Philip's first ever publicist.

Larry Lowenstein wrote that by 1959, "Rogers and Cowan was probably the most successful celebrity PR firm in the world." Headquartered in Los Angeles, it was at this time that they opened an office in New York to create a strong presence on the East Coast as well. Lowenstein was hired to manage this office and described Rogers as a "micromanager." Lowenstein described him as wanting things done his way no matter how unrealistic the expectations, and he didn't want to hear about the realities of New York media operations versus Hollywood operations.

Charles Champin of The New York Times wrote, "[I]n 1965, Rogers & Cowan was the powerhouse among independent publicity agencies servicing the entertainment industry." This was attributed to the shrinking of the major studios in the growth years of television, and the decimating of the studio publicity staffs in particular, which had created boom times for the independents.

== Hollywood ==
Henry Rogers is credited by The New York Times as the founder of modern-day publicity. The New York Times wrote, "Henry C. Rogers transformed the seedy world of the Hollywood press agent into a plush-carpet profession. Rogers was known as the man who elevated industry ethical standards, particularly through his insistence that public relations professionals had as much responsibility to the news media as they did to their clients."

Rita Hayworth kick-started Rogers' career in the Hollywood industry. Rogers met Hayworth in 1939. After being a bit deceitful, Rogers was able to get Hayworth on the cover of Look Magazine, and as a result she signed a contract with him. Rita Hayworth's debut on the cover of Look made her famous, and as a result, Rogers became known as well.

In 1940, Rogers was hired by Claudette Colbert and was actually accepted into the publicity business. Joan Crawford then hired Rogers in 1945 after she had been fired by Metro-Goldwyn-Mayer and blackballed in the business.

=== McCarthyism ===
During the McCarthy era, in which many celebrities were accused of being communists without regard for evidence, Rogers took the difficult job of defending those who had been accused. He did so at the risk of his own career.

== See also ==
- Warren Cowan
- Rogers & Cowan
