= The Big Myth =

2023 book by Naomi Oreskes and Erik M. Conway

- Author: Naomi Oreskes; Erik M. Conway
- Subject: Politics of science, Market fundamentalism
- Publisher: Bloomsbury Publishing (2023)
- Pages: 565
- ISBN: 978-1-63557-357-2
- OCLC: 1369492221

The Big Myth: How American Business Taught Us to Loathe Government and Love the Free Market is a non-fiction book written in 2023 by American historians of science Naomi Oreskes and Erik M. Conway.

It claims to identify a century-long disinformation campaign to convince the American public of a market-first approach to politics. Oreskes and Conway follow the history of corporations and businessmen coordinating with figures from across political, cultural and intellectual spheres who, the authors argue, used methods ranging from storytelling and textbooks with biased information to outright censorship.

== Background ==
During the research for Oreskes and Conway's previous book, Merchants of Doubt, the authors kept stumbling across a larger pattern of general anti-government ideas. As their research gradually began to suggest coordination in the efforts to spread these ideas, they decided this should be the subject of its own book.

The authors also describe that Senator Tim Wirth encouraged them to write a companion book describing what to do about their previous findings. While not a manual on countering politically motivated science denial, The Big Myth explains the "why" of science denial while Merchants of Doubt provides the "how".

== Summary ==
Oreskes and Conway argue that owners of large businesses have twisted Adam Smith's original, nuanced ideas of capitalism and the appropriate use of markets into a version serving mainly their own interests. Through a process of omission, reframing, propaganda and networking, they spread a new, free market fundamentalist ideology, estranged from the more socially-minded versions of capitalism that earlier thinkers proposed.

The authors show that this was accomplished by taking originally anti-New Deal arguments and building false academic legitimacy on them, while also making inroads in different communities, such as religious groups, entertainment, educational institutions and radio shows.

The book begins by describing the first organizations to champion free-market fundamentalism for their financial gain, the National Association of Manufacturers (NAM) and the National Electric Light Association (NELA). The authors focus on their methods of disinformation. The associations wanted to convince the public that government intervention to regulate or direct the economy (such as through supporting rural electrification) was both against the American way of life and ineffective. Conway and Oreskes describe how NAM introduced the concept of a "tripod of freedom," claiming that market freedom is necessary for political freedom and representative democracy, where the last two cannot coexist without the first. The book shows that while NAM and its allies were unsuccessful in spreading this idea during the New Deal era, changing public perception on the nature of freedom would remain central to their strategy.

The authors then move on to the 1950s-1970s, describing how the groundwork laid by NAM and NELA was taken up by influential businessmen to fight the implementation of the New Deal. These actors do this through different astroturfing efforts in education, religion, entertainment, and academia. The authors criticize that business tycoons artificially selected and bankrolled anti-communist and free-market fundamentalist thinkers in each of these sectors. For example, they paid the salaries of academics such as Ludwig von Mises and Milton Friedman, whose ideas were previously met with academic skepticism, and distributed copies of Ayn Rand's writings for free.

The authors then turn to the events and forces which moved these cultivated ideas into the political and cultural mainstream. Some groups, such as General Electric through the TV program General Electric Theatre, produced stories reinforcing the beliefs which would support a free-market fundamentalist outlook. In the political arena, the authors highlight that the initial deregulationist turn from the Carter administration was massively enhanced during the Reagan administration. By the dawn of the campaign which saw Bill Clinton elected, both of the main parties in the US had accepted the general bounds of free-market fundamentalist thinking, and Clinton would continue to enact deregulatory policies under the pretense of "modernization."

The authors finish with a list of modern issues which have been exacerbated by the proliferation of free-market fundamentalism, such as COVID-19, opioids, and gun control, while also providing some examples from other countries which are capitalist but not quite as adherent to the same fundamentalism as is found in the US.

== Reception ==
The book received mostly positive reviews. A review in The New York Times by Jennifer Szalai praised the book "an impressive job of uncovering the resources that groups like the National Association of Manufacturers and the Foundation for Economic Education put into spreading the (greed is good) word. The Economist describes the book as "richly researched and successful in chronicling a concerted effort by American business to shift public opinion in favor of free markets".

Holden Thorp in Science.org hails The Big Myth as an "outstanding book that provides crucial insight into the process of how market fundamentalism leads to science denial". The Financial Times's Andrew Edgecliffe-Johnson encourages "today's executives" to learn from The Big Myth's perspective and change "their companies' role in our societies" for the better: "stop pushing the idea that the only role of government is to get out of its way". Publishers Weekly describes the book as a "polemical yet scrupulously researched [...] wake-up call" that "rings loud and clear".

Notably, reviews by pro-free market outlets critiqued in the book were less positive. The Foundation for Economic Education, itself extensively discussed in the book, argued that Oreskes and Conway 'swing and miss' in their criticism of free-market capitalism.
