= LaCorte =

LaCorte is a surname. Notable people with the surname include:

- Frank LaCorte (born 1951), American baseball player
- Ken LaCorte (born 1965), American television executive
