= Merchants of Doubt (film) =

2014 American documentary film by Robert Kenner

- theatrical release poster
- Directed by: Robert Kenner
- Written by: Robert Kenner; Kim Roberts
- Based on: Merchants of Doubt by Naomi Oreskes and Erik M. Conway
- Produced by: Robert Kenner; Melissa Robledo
- Cinematography: Don Lenzer; Barry Berona; Jay Redmond
- Edited by: Kim Roberts
- Music by: Mark Adler
- Production company: Participant Media
- Distributed by: Sony Pictures Classics
- Release date: August 30, 2014 (Telluride)
- Running time: 96 minutes
- Country: United States
- Language: English
- Box office: $308,156 (United States)

Merchants of Doubt is a 2014 American documentary film directed by Robert Kenner and inspired by the 2010 book of the same name by Naomi Oreskes and Erik M. Conway. The film traces the use of public relations tactics that were originally developed by the tobacco industry to protect their business from research indicating health risks from smoking. The most prominent of these tactics is the cultivation of scientists and others who successfully cast doubt on scientific results. Using a professional magician, the film explores the analogy between these tactics and the methods used by magicians to distract their audiences from observing how illusions are performed. For the tobacco industry, the tactics successfully delayed government regulation until long after the establishment of scientific consensus about the health risks from smoking. As its second example, the film describes how manufacturers of flame retardants worked to protect their sales after toxic effects of the retardants were reported in the scientific literature. The central concern of the film is the ongoing use of these tactics to forestall governmental action to regulate greenhouse gas emissions in response to the risks of global climate change.

== Production ==
=== Interview subjects ===
The filmmakers interviewed more than a dozen individuals who have been involved in a series of conflicts ranging from the regulation of tobacco products to global climate change. In the order in which they appear in the film, the interview subjects are:

- Stanton Glantz, a professor of medicine and activist for regulation of tobacco smoking. In 1994, Glantz received a carton of documents copied from the records of the Brown and Williamson tobacco company that revealed their awareness of health risks of smoking tobacco as early as the 1950s.
- Sam Roe and Patricia Callahan, reporters at the Chicago Tribune newspaper who, in 2012, exposed "manufacturers that imperil public health by continuing to use toxic fire retardants in household furniture and crib mattresses, triggering reform efforts at the state and national level." Callahan and Roe were finalists for a Pulitzer Prize for Investigative Reporting.
- James Hansen, a former NASA scientist whose 1988 testimony on climate change to congressional committees helped raise broad awareness of global warming. Hansen has become a prominent advocate for regulation of greenhouse gas emissions.
- John Passacantando, a former executive director of Greenpeace, an organization of environmental activists.
- William O'Keefe, the chief executive officer of the George C. Marshall Institute, an organization that opposes government regulation of greenhouse gas emissions.

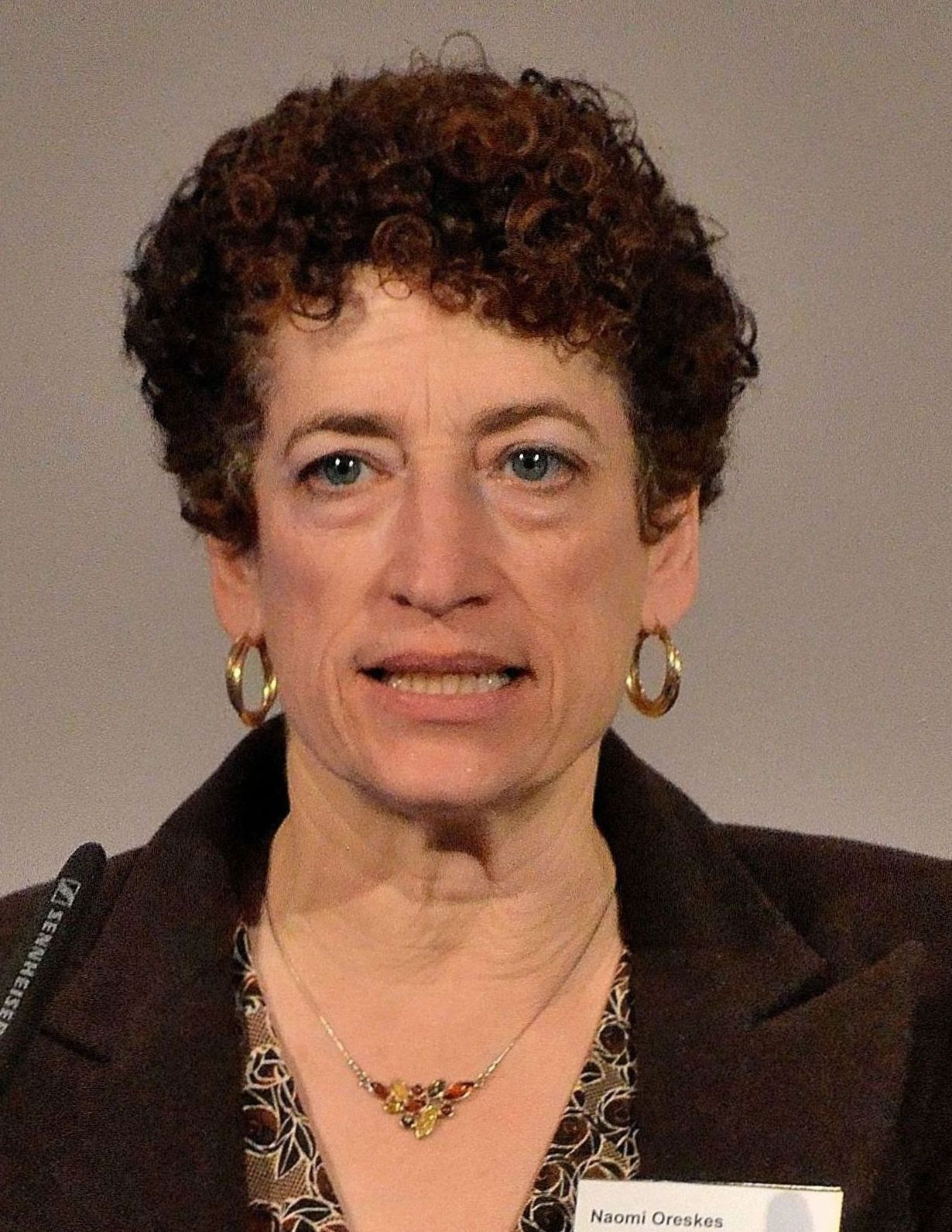
Naomi Oreskes (2015), co-author of the book Merchants of Doubt

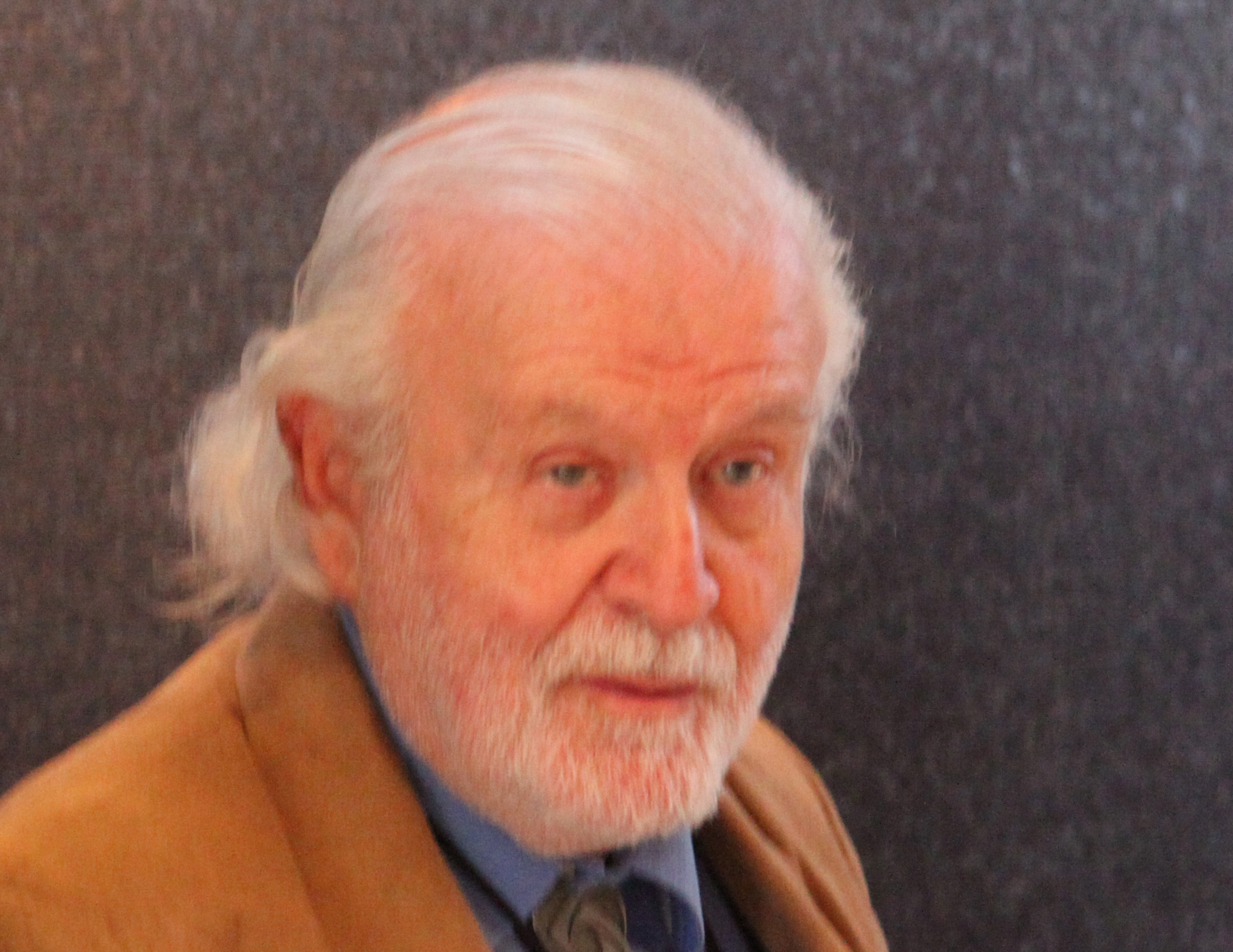
Fred Singer (2011), a prominent opponent of greenhouse gas regulation

- Naomi Oreskes, a professor of the history of science, and the co-author of the book that inspired the film.
- Fred Singer, a physicist and environmental scientist who founded the Science & Environmental Policy Project (SEPP) in 1990 to work against regulation of greenhouse gas emissions, among other issues.
- Michael Shermer, a writer and publisher of the magazine Skeptic. Shermer was initially a "contrarian" regarding regulation of greenhouse gas emissions, but his views changed as the scientific evidence regarding climate change advanced.
- Matthew Crawford, a writer and former director of the George C. Marshall Institute. Crawford resigned over the influence of the Institute's sponsors in determining the Institute's activities and positions.
- Marc Morano, a political activist who has published the climate denial website ClimateDepot since 2009. To encourage complaints to scientists whose work is viewed as supporting action on greenhouse gas emission, the website publishes their addresses.
- Ben Santer, Michael E. Mann, and Katharine Hayhoe, climate scientists who have received personal threats because of their work on global climate change.
- Tim Phillips, the president of Americans for Prosperity, which works against government regulation of climate change and other issues.
- Bob Inglis, a former U.S. representative for South Carolina's 4th congressional district who lost his seat in the primary election following his announcement that he had changed his opinion and now believes global climate change is a problem the government should address. After losing his seat in Congress, Inglis began working to gain support for action to combat global climate change in conservative areas of the United States.

=== Professional magic ===
The film embeds commentary and performances by magician Jamy Ian Swiss. The premise of these interludes is that there is an analogy between the techniques of professional magicians and the tactics of public relations organizations: magicians learn how to distract their audiences from noticing the deceptions that underlie their tricks and illusions, while the organizations distract the public from the risks associated with products. These tactics were systematically developed by the tobacco industry in the 1950s in response to scientific research showing that smoking was a significant health risk, as the research was a significant threat to tobacco sales. The principal distraction tactic has been the use of convincing personalities who claim that uncertainties about the risks justify a delay in taking action.

An unsigned review in The Boston Globe explains: "To make his point clear, Kenner follows up Swiss’s magic act and fancy patter with a snappy montage of various experts over the years denying that cigarettes cause cancer, or extolling the virtues of pesticide, or proclaiming that asbestos is 'designed to last a lifetime — a trouble free lifetime.' And then the inevitable parade of climate change deniers bloviating in Congress or on cable news, all backed by Sinatra singing 'That Old Black Magic.'" A. O. Scott wrote in The New York Times that Swiss' "presence, and the animated playing cards that sometimes fly across the screen, feel like a glib and somewhat condescending gimmick, an attempt to wring some fun out of a grim and appalling story."

== Reception ==
=== Threatened lawsuit ===
One of the subjects of the film, Fred Singer, wrote the director indicating that he was considering a lawsuit. Although no suit was filed, Kenner noted in an interview that "when [Singer] implies litigation is very expensive, I think it's an attempt to be intimidating." In the 1990s, Singer had sued Justin Lancaster over his statements regarding the inclusion of Roger Revelle as a co-author of a climate change paper with Singer and Chauncey Starr; Revelle had died shortly after the paper was published. That lawsuit ended when Lancaster withdrew his statements as "unwarranted", although Lancaster later expressed regret over the settlement.

=== Critics' views ===
The film was widely reviewed in the mainstream U.S. media and garnered mostly positive reviews. On review aggregator website Rotten Tomatoes, it holds an approval rating of 86% based on 90 reviews, with an average score of 7.0/10; the site's "critics consensus" reads: "Merchants of Doubt is a thought-provoking documentary assembled with energy and style, even if it doesn't dig as deep as it could." On Metacritic, the film has a weighted average score of 70 out of 100 based on 24 critics, indicating "generally favorable reviews".

Justin Chang wrote for Variety that the film is "An intelligent, solidly argued and almost too-polished takedown of America’s spin factory — that network of professional fabricators, obfuscators and pseudo-scientists who have lately attempted to muddle the scientific debate around global warming — this is a movie so intrigued by its designated villains that it almost conveys a perverse form of admiration, and the fascination proves contagious." William Goss wrote for The Austin Chronicle that "Merchants spends much of its running time exposing trends of political subterfuge before working in an earnest call to action regarding climate change. Using the same type of tinkling score and shots of children at play as campaign ads shown earlier in the film, this late-inning agenda comes off as noble as it is hypocritical. Regardless of one’s personal beliefs, it’s tough to respect a movie that ultimately invites viewers to question every case of propaganda except its own."

== Home media ==
Merchants of Doubt was released as a 2-disc Blu-ray/DVD combo pack on July 7, 2015.
