= Conservative Edition News =

Controversial Websites

- Owner: Ken LaCorte

Conservative Edition News (along with its sister website Liberal Edition News) is one of a pair of controversial websites controlled by Ken LaCorte, a former Fox News executive.

== History ==
According to the New York Times, Ken LaCorte confirmed control of both websites in November 2019. Prior to this, who controlled the websites had been a mystery. Both websites contain small print at the bottom of their pages stating “By Bivona Digital Inc” – whose address is a drop box in Sausalito, California. The websites are written, according to the Times's investigation, by a network of authors in Macedonia, previously known for publishing disinformation during the 2016 US presidential election. According to LaCorte, editing was done by editors in the United States.

The Times reports that Conservative Edition News contains content "guaranteed to infuriate the American right," while Liberal Edition News contains stories "guaranteed to drive liberal voters further left or to wring a visceral response from moderates." LaCorte said that the purpose of the sites was to drive traffic to his principal venture LaCorte News, a “centrist-right” website that he brands as a “digital news start-up with the stated goal of restoring faith in the media.”

When LaCorte admitted that he had been secretly operating the partisan websites, he also confirmed he had hired Macedonian teenagers to write the content. In November 2019, Facebook shut down the pages for Conservative Edition News and Liberal Edition News for terms of service violations that included manipulation of site privileges and engagement with well-known Macedonian “troll farms”.
