= Harry Crane =

American screenwriter (1914–1999)

- Born: Harry Kravitsky; April 23, 1914; Brooklyn, New York, U.S.
- Died: September 13, 1999 (aged 85); Beverly Hills, California, U.S.
- Occupation: Comedy writer
- Known for: Co-creator of the concept behind The Honeymooners
- Spouses: Julia Grandes; Lillian Reifman
- Children: 2 Stephanie Crane Hirsh and Barbara Gilbert Cowan
- Family: Melissa Gilbert (granddaughter); Sara Gilbert (granddaughter); Jonathan Gilbert (grandson); Warren Cowan (son-in-law)

Harry Crane (né Kravitsky; April 23, 1914 – September 13, 1999) was an American comedy writer who helped to create the concept for The Honeymooners and its signature characters.

== Biography ==
Crane was born Harry Kravitsky to a Jewish family on April 23, 1914, in Brooklyn, New York. He worked as a stand-up comedian in the Borscht Belt while a teenager. In 1943, he was hired as a writer by Metro-Goldwyn-Mayer and wrote several screenplays including Air Raid Wardens (1943) starring Stan Laurel and Oliver Hardy, Lost in a Harem (1944) starring Lou Costello and Bud Abbott; The Harvey Girls (1946) starring Judy Garland and Angela Lansbury; the Ziegfeld Follies (uncredited) (1946) with Fred Astaire, Lucille Ball, and Fanny Brice; the Song of the Thin Man (1947) starring Myrna Loy and William Powell. He also wrote additional dialogue for Two Sisters from Boston (1946) and Take Me Out to the Ball Game (uncredited).

In the 1950s, he began working in television with the DuMont Television Network. Crane successfully recommended Jackie Gleason, whom he knew from his time as a comedian in New York, to DuMont as host for their show the Cavalcade of Stars. In 1951, while working with Joe Bigelow on Cavalcade of Stars, Gleason asked them to produce a sketch of him as a working class Brooklyn guy with a nagging wife. The two created the characters Ralph and Alice Kramden, who became a recurring act in Gleason's show. The act eventually became a standalone program entitled The Honeymooners on CBS, which ran from 1955 to 1956. Crane wrote comedic scripts and jokes for many comedians including Jimmy Durante, Abbott and Costello, the Marx Brothers, Milton Berle, and Jerry Lewis. He also wrote jokes for singers including Bing Crosby, Frank Sinatra, Dinah Shore, Perry Como, Alan King, Dean Martin, Eddie Fisher, Red Skelton, Liberace and Henny Youngman.

Crane wrote for the Academy Awards in 1957 and 1959; the Golden Globes in 1968; and the Emmy Awards in 1968, 1971, 1973 and 1974. In 1965, he resuscitated the Dean Martin Show which had been suffering from poor ratings and added the concept of the celebrity roast; he was nominated for an Emmy in 1966-67 for his efforts.

== Personal life ==
Crane married twice. He had two daughters with his first wife, Julia Grandes: Stephanie Crane Hirsh, and Barbara Gilbert Cowan (married to publicist Warren Cowan). Julia Grandes Crane, born in Connecticut on April 28,1917, died on December 1, 2018, in Los Angeles, California, at age 101.

In 1958, Crane married his second wife, Lillian Reifman (1918-2010) to whom he remained married until his death. Crane mentored her son from a previous marriage, writer Ed Scharlach. Crane is the grandfather of the television actresses Melissa Gilbert and Sara Gilbert and actor Jonathan Gilbert. His daughter Stephanie Crane was in a relationship with Bill Cosby's son, Ennis Cosby who was killed in 1997 while on his way to visit her. Crane was interred at Mount Sinai Memorial Park Cemetery.
