= Rogers & Cowan =

American marketing and public relations agency

- Industry: Public Relations; Marketing
- Founded: 1950
- Founder: Henry Rogers and Warren Cowan
- Headquarters: Los Angeles
- Area served: Worldwide
- Key people: Mark Owens, CEO
- Parent: Interpublic Group of Companies
- Website: www.rcpmk.com

Rogers & Cowan is a global marketing and public relations agency headquartered in Los Angeles. A division of the Interpublic Group of Companies (NYSE: IPG), it also maintains offices in New York, Miami, and London. The firm was founded in 1950 by Henry C. Rogers and Warren Cowan.

The firm became known for representing talent outside of the traditional Hollywood studio system. Over time, Rogers & Cowan expanded its work to include film and television publicity, music promotion, fashion campaigns, and branded entertainment.

In 2019, Rogers & Cowan merged with PMK BNC, another IPG firm, forming the combined entity R&CPMK.

== History ==
Rogers & Cowan was founded in 1950 in Los Angeles, California, by Henry C. Rogers and Warren Cowan. At the time, actors and actresses were promoted almost exclusively by the film studios with whom they were under contract, and Rogers and Cowan began instead to promote them independent of the studio system.

In 1987, Rogers & Cowan was acquired by the London-based Shandwick P.L.C., the largest public relations consultancy in the UK. Shandwick PLC was in turn purchased by New York-based Interpublic Group of Companies in 1998. Tom Tardio served as Rogers and Cowan's chairman and CEO beginning in 1991. in 2016, Mark Owens joined as CEO. Paul Bloch, one of the firm's original partners, is the company's co-chairman.

In the early 1990s, Rogers & Cowan expanded into publicity for film festivals, cable and network television programming, album launches, concert tours, fashion designers and collections, and awards show campaigns and high-profile entertainment events. In addition, Tardio led Rogers & Cowan into digital and streaming entertainment, enhanced television, and consumer electronic devices.

Since 2004, Rogers & Cowan has acquired talent and resources from the fields of international film (Denmead Marketing, 2004) fashion (Film Fashion, 2005), arts and culture (Hinckley & Co., 2006), television and lifestyle marketing (Spotlight Communications, 2008), and faith and family marketing (L.A.B. Media, 2008). Additionally, in 2009, Tardio launched AllWays Integrated Marketing, a separate PR brand focused on meshing key PR disciplines.

In 2013, Rogers & Cowan acquired Shannon Barr Public Relations and Zucker Public Relations. In March 2015, Tom Tardio was appointed Chairman of the Board of Socialtext, an enterprise social software provider, after serving as Rogers & Cowan chief executive officer for more than 25 years.

Mark Owens was named chief executive officer in November 2015. He previously served as the company's chief revenue officer.

On July 30, 2019, Rogers & Cowan announced that it had merged with sister IPG publicity firm PMK BNC.

The combined firm was named R&CPMK. In early 2024, Mark Owens was fired from that firm and started another company, 2PM Sharp. In November 2024, R&CPMK filed a lawsuit in New York accusing 2PM Sharp of poaching their employees, clients and confidential information. Mark Owens is referenced as a party to the actions of the defendants throughout the lawsuit.

== Campaigns ==
Rogers & Cowan's campaigns include the relaunch of MySpace, a consumer awareness campaign for The Cooking Channel, a multi-platform campaign for Sprite Films, and Target's live performance media buy with the Imagine Dragons for the 2015 GRAMMY Awards.

The company also does product placement into films, television programs, music videos and webisodes, including the integration of American Airlines into Paramount Pictures' Up in the Air.

== Awards ==
Rogers & Cowan's awards include a 2013 CSR Award for an EKOCYCLE Coca-Cola campaign, a PRSA Silver Anvil Award of Excellence (USA Pro Cycling Challenge); an Adweek Buzz Award Microsoft Windows Live; and a PRism Award. Additionally, Rogers & Cowan was named Agency of the Year by the Bulldog Reporter in 2012 and 2013.
