= Manhattan by Numbers =

1993 film by Amir Naderi

Manhattan by Numbers is a 1993 film by the Iranian director Amir Naderi. It features John Wojda, Daniel Oreskes and Mary F. Geng in the principal acting roles.
