= Josette Banzet =

French-American actress (1938–2020)

- Born: 6 April 1938
- Died: 4 December 2020 (aged 82)
- Occupation: Actress
- Known for: Golden Globe Award winner
- Spouse(s): ?? (m. 19??; div. 19??); Warren Cowan (m. 1973; div. 19??); Tommy Roe (m. 19??)

Josette Banzet, Marquise de Bruyenne (6 April 1938 – 4 December 2020) was a French-American actress. She won a Golden Globe Award for Best Supporting Actress in a Series, Miniseries or Television Film for her performance in Rich Man, Poor Man.

== Biography ==
The daughter of a French politician, Banzet was raised in Paris, Indochina, and Morocco. She attended college in Miami, where she met her first husband; they divorced soon after. She then pursued acting, where she appeared in a play on Broadway, and then moved to Hollywood, where she began her acting career. In 1973, she married Hollywood public relations mogul Warren Cowan. Her third marriage was to American pop music star Tommy Roe. On 22 March 2019, Roe announced that Banzet was in the advanced stages of Alzheimer's; she died 4 December 2020.

== Filmography ==
- Rich Man, Poor Man (1976)
- The Other Side of Midnight (1977)
- Blind Ambition (1979)
- Hollywood Knight (1979)
