= John Moody (journalist) =

American journalist

John Moody is an American journalist. He served as the executive editor and the executive vice president of Fox News. He was previously the chief executive officer of NewsCore, the former internal wire service of Rupert Murdoch's News Corporation (the then-parent company of 20th Century Fox and Fox News), as well as senior vice president, news editorial, for the Fox News Channel prior to that.

== Early life, education and career ==
Moody was born in Pittsburgh, Pennsylvania. Moody is a 1975 graduate of Cornell University, where he worked for WVBR-FM. He then began working for United Press International, serving successively as the Moscow and Paris bureau chief.

Afterwards, Moody went to work for Time, serving as the Vatican correspondent and bureau chiefs for Rome, Latin America and finally New York. As the N.Y. bureau chief, Moody was against the 1996 Time/Warner buyout of Turner Broadcasting. He instructed his staff "not to co-operate" with CNN, which he saw as a competitor to Time.

In 1992, Moody received the Inter-American Press Association Bartholomew Mitre Award for his interview with Cali cartel kingpin Gilberto Rodriguez Orejuela.

An anti-Fox News documentary, Outfoxed, accused Moody of circulating internal memos encouraging political bias in Fox's reporting.

After three different Fox News shows in January 2007 repeated an Insight on the News story about Barack Obama attending a radical madrassa school as a child, Moody said Fox "commentators had erred by citing the Clinton-Obama report. The hosts violated one of our general rules, which is know what you are talking about. They reported information from a publication whose accuracy we didn't know."

On August 15, 2008, Moody wrote an editorial lambasting John Murtha for saying, "There is no question that western Pennsylvania is a racist area." As a native of west Pennsylvania, Moody said Murtha can "go to hell" and called him a "jagoff."

On February 8, 2018, Moody wrote an editorial arguing that the U.S. Olympic Committee wants to change the Olympic Games' motto to "Darker, Gayer, Different." "No sport that we are aware of awards points — or medals — for skin color or sexual orientation," Moody said. Fox News pulled the column, stating that it did "not reflect the views or values of FOX News." In March 2018, he retired from Fox News.

In 2018, former Fox News executive Ken LaCorte recruited Moody and former NPR editorial director Michael Oreskes to launch LaCorte News, a digital news startup "restoring faith in media." An investigation by New York Times in November 2019 found that LaCorte was using "Russian tactics" to disseminate divisive content via websites he covertly controlled.

== Works ==
- John Moody and Ropger Boyes, The Priest Who Had to Die, Gollancz (June 1, 1986), ISBN 978-0-575-03830-1
- John Moody, Moscow Magician: A Thriller, St. Martin's Press (January 14, 1991), ISBN 978-0-312-05473-1
- John Moody, Kiss It Good-Bye: The Mystery, The Mormon, and the Moral of the 1960 Pittsburgh Pirates, Shadow Mountain (March 3, 2010), ISBN 978-1-60641-149-0
- John Moody, Of Course They Knew, Of Course They ..., Brick Tower Press / J.T. Colby & Company (September 11, 2021), ISBN 978-1-88328-392-6
