= Sam Jaffe (producer) =

American filmmaker (1901–2000)

- Born: May 21, 1901; Harlem, New York City
- Died: January 10, 2000 (aged 98); Los Angeles, California, US
- Occupation: Movie producer
- Spouse: Mildred Gersh
- Children: 3
- Relatives: Matt Tolmach (grandson); Adeline Schulberg (sister); Budd Schulberg (nephew); Phil Gersh (brother-in-law); B. P. Schulberg (brother-in-law); John Kohn (son-in-law)

Sam Jaffe (May 21, 1901 – January 10, 2000) was, at different points in his career in the motion picture industry, an agent, a producer, and a studio executive.

== Biography ==
Jaffe was born in the Harlem neighborhood of New York City, the son of Russian-Jewish immigrants Hannah and Max Jaffe. He had three older siblings: Joseph, David, and Adeline. He was raised on the Lower East Side of Manhattan.

After dropping out of DeWitt Clinton High School, he took a job as an office boy for the Famous Players–Lasky Corporation where his brother-in-law, B. P. Schulberg, was an executive. He eventually worked his way up through the ranks to become the executive in charge of production including films directed by Ernst Lubitsch, Josef von Sternberg, and Rouben Mamoulian. In 1932, he was released from Paramount over internal politics.

He worked briefly for Harry Cohn at Columbia Pictures before joining the Schulberg-Feldman agency, co-founded by his older sister Adeline Schulberg with Charles K. Feldman. In 1933, his sister left the firm to form the Ad Schulberg agency after her divorce from B.P. Schulberg; the firm represented such top actors as Marlene Dietrich, Fredric March, and Herbert Marshall before she sold it and moved to London.

In 1935, Jaffe opened his own talent agency named the Jaffe Agency. While running the agency, he convinced 20th Century Fox head Darryl F. Zanuck to let him produce The Fighting Sullivans in 1944. He successfully represented several stars and directors of the era, including Humphrey Bogart, Fritz Lang, Raoul Walsh, Stanley Kubrick, Lauren Bacall, David Niven, Zero Mostel, Richard Burton, Mary Astor, Barbara Stanwyck, Lee J. Cobb, and Jennifer Jones. In the late 1940s, his business was negatively affected by the investigations of many of his clients by the House Un-American Activities Committee investigations into Hollywood. In 1949, he sold the Jaffe Agency to his brother-in-law, Phil Gersh, who had been working with him.

In 1959, Jaffe retired and moved to London. There he produced several films, including Born Free (1966) and Theater of Blood (1973). In 1985, he returned to Los Angeles and became a collector of modern art. He died in 2000 at age 98

== Personal life ==
Jaffe was married to Mildred Gersh, also from New York. One of her younger brothers was Phil Gersh, who moved from New York to Los Angeles and became a Hollywood agent. After working with Jaffe, Gersh purchased the Jaffe Agency in 1949. He renamed it in the 1960s as The Gersh Agency.

Sam and Mildred Jaffe had three daughters: Naomi Jaffe Carroll, Barbara Jaffe Kohn, and Judith Jaffe Tolmach Silber.

== Partial filmography ==
- Theater of Blood (1973)
- Born Free (1966)
- Damian and Pythias (1962)
- The Fighting Sullivans (1944)
- Diplomaniacs (1933)
- The Vanishing Frontier (1932)
