= Warren Cowan =

American film industry publicist (1921–2008)

- Born: March 13, 1921; New York City, NY, U.S.
- Died: May 14, 2008 (aged 87); Los Angeles, California, U.S.
- Occupation: Film industry publicist
- Spouse(s): Ronnie Cowan (m. 194?; div. 195?) Barbara Rush (m. 1959; div. 1970) Josette Banzet (m. 1973; div. 1979); Barbara Gilbert (m. 1995)
- Children: 3, including Claudia Cowan

Warren Cowan (March 13, 1921 – May 14, 2008) was an American film industry publicist. He co-founded the public relations company Rogers & Cowan in 1954 and founded his own company, Cowan & Associates, in 1994. He was described as "one of Hollywood’s most powerful and innovative publicists" at the time of his death.

== Early life ==
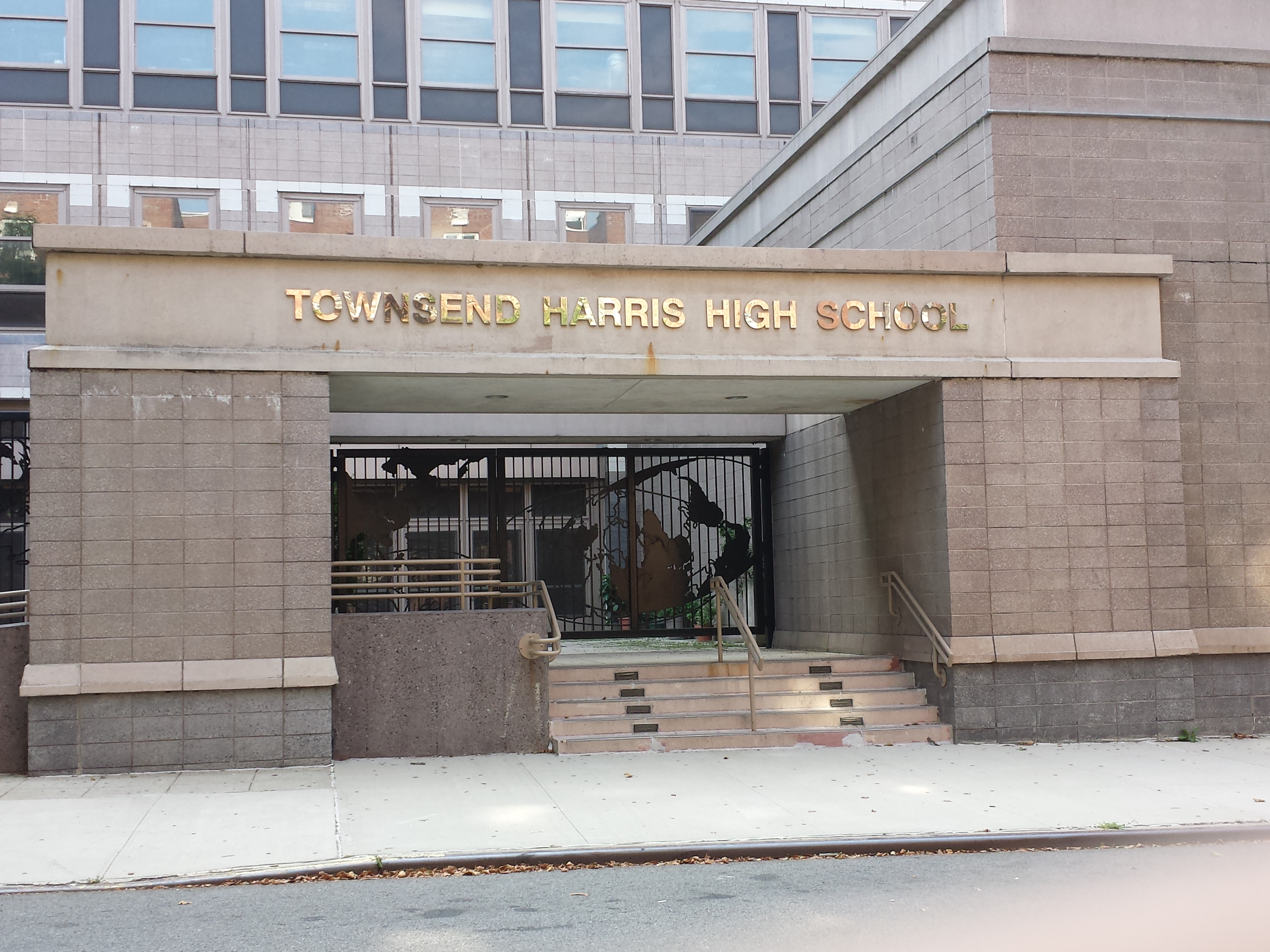
Townsend Harris High School

He was born to a Jewish family in New York City, the son of songwriter Rubey Cowan and Grace Cowan. He had one older brother, Stanley, who was also a songwriter. He attended Townsend Harris High School, a school for boys on the educational fast track. While attending the University of California, Los Angeles, Cowan majored in journalism and represented actress Linda Darnell. Cowan served in the United States Army Air Forces during World War II for three years.

== Career ==
In 1946, Cowan joined the firm established by Henry C. Rogers. In 1950, he became a partner in the firm, which then changed its name to Rogers & Cowan. He was named president in 1964. Rogers & Cowan became one of the largest entertainment public relations firm in the world handling not only entertainers but also high-tech manufacturers, athletes, publishers, movie studios and trade unions. Whenever he was asked to name his favourite client, Cowan's constant answer was always "the next one."

In 1950, Cowan staged the first celebrity charity-fundraiser, a golf tournament on behalf of motion picture director Frank Borzage. Rogers was the first agent to actively solicit public support for his client's nomination for an Academy Award, starting with Joan Crawford's performance in 1945's Mildred Pierce; she won Best Actress. In 1997, Cowan personally introduced Italian actor Roberto Benigni to his already famous American peers, all of them Cowan clients and Academy voters, on behalf of Miramax. Benigni and his picture, Life Is Beautiful, won three Oscars that year.

In 1988, Rogers & Cowan company was sold to Shandwick Plc., an English conglomerate. "It was the right move to make in some respects, but I found that I was doing too much that was administrative and too little that was creative," Cowan said. Cowan remained as chairman until 1992. In 1994, after a two-year non-competitive period, he launched a new company, Warren Cowan & Associates.

== Personal life ==
Cowan had five marriages, four of which ended in divorce, including two to actress Barbara Rush.

He and his first wife, entertainment columnist Ronnie Cowan (1926-1997), had two daughters, Bonnie and Linda. Linda was killed by a drunk driver in 1989.

He had one child with his second wife Barbara Rush, Fox News Channel reporter Claudia Cowan.

His third wife was French actress Josette Banzet.

His fourth marriage was to Barbara Gilbert-Cowan, daughter of comedy writer Harry Crane, to whom he remained married until his death. She is the mother of actors Melissa Gilbert, Sara Gilbert, and Jonathan Gilbert.

He had eight grandchildren. He died on May 14, 2008, of cancer at his home in Los Angeles. He is buried at Mount Sinai Memorial Park Cemetery.
