= Matt Tolmach =

Producer

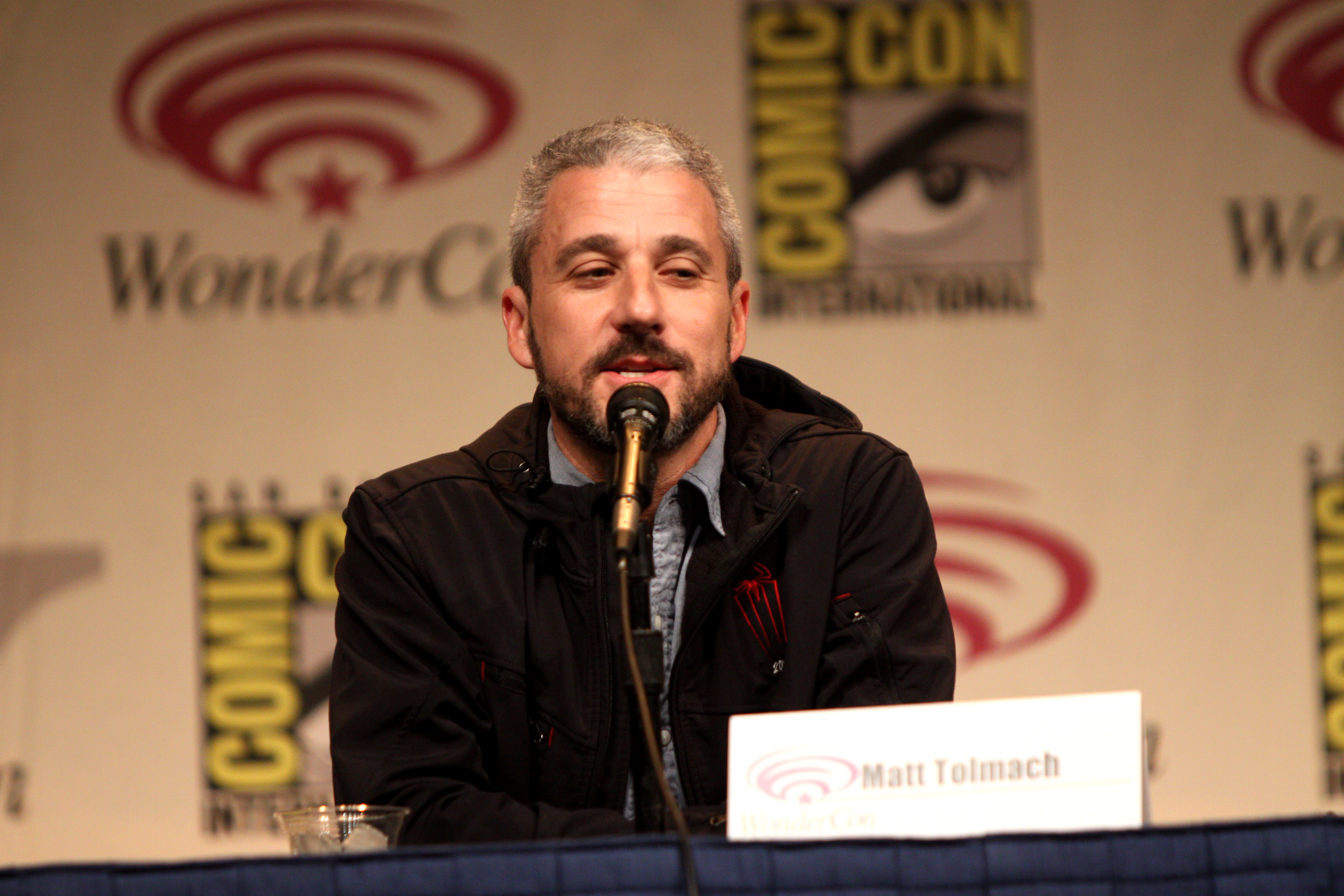
- Matt Tolmach speaking at the 2012 WonderCon in Anaheim, California
- Born: Matthew Tolmach; 1964 (age 61–62); New York City, New York, U.S.
- Education: Beloit College
- Occupation: Film producer
- Spouse: Paige Goldberg
- Children: 1
- Relatives: Sam Jaffe (grandfather); Adeline Schulberg (great-aunt)

Matthew Tolmach (born 1964) is an American film producer and former co-president of production at Sony Pictures Entertainment.

== Early life ==
Tolmach first became interested in film after hearing stories from his grandfather, producer and film executive Sam Jaffe. He is of Jewish descent.

== Career ==
After moving to Los Angeles, he landed a job with Frank Marshall to make a documentary about Lance Armstrong that was directed by Alex Gibney. In 1994, Tolmach then joined Turner Pictures, before he joined Columbia Pictures in 1997. In 2008, he was named co-president of production at Sony Pictures Entertainment with Doug Belgrad (whom he had been working with since 2003) where he managed the Spider-Man franchise. In 2010, he left Sony Pictures Entertainment to produce the next installment of Spider-Man. Belgrad was named as sole president of the studio and Hanna Minghella was named president of production.

== Personal life ==
Tolmach is married to director Paige Goldberg. They have one child.

== Filmography ==
Producer

- Money for Nothing (1993)
- Coldblooded (1995)
- The Amazing Spider-Man (2012)
- The Armstrong Lie (2013)
- The Amazing Spider-Man 2 (2014)
- Freaks of Nature (2015)
- Rough Night (2017)
- Jumanji: Welcome to the Jungle (2017)
- Venom (2018)
- Jumanji: The Next Level (2019)
- Venom: Let There Be Carnage (2021)
- Morbius (2022)
- Fate of a Sport (2022)
- Dark Harvest (2023)
- Venom: The Last Dance (2024)
- Kraven the Hunter (2024)
- Jumanji: Open World (2026)
- Bubble (TBA)

Executive producer

- Spider-Man: Homecoming (2017)
- What Haunts Us (2018)
- Spider-Man: Far From Home (2019)
- Future Man (2017-2020)
- Wildflower (2020)
- Spider-Man: No Way Home (2021)
- Dark Matter (TV series) (2024–present)
- Stepdude (forthcoming)
- The Rosie Project (forthcoming)

Special thanks

- Sausage Party (2016)
