= Why We Drive =

2020 American non-fiction book by Matthew Crawford

Why We Drive: Toward a Philosophy of the Open Road
- Cover of 2020 hardback edition
- Author: Matthew Crawford
- Language: English
- Subject: Driving, technology, self-governance
- Genre: Philosophy, social commentary, memoir
- Publisher: William Morrow and Company
- Publication date: June 9, 2020
- Pages: 368
- ISBN: 978-0-06-274196-7
- Website: harpercollins.com/products/why-we-drive-matthew-b-crawford

Why We Drive: Toward a Philosophy of the Open Road (published in the United Kingdom as Why We Drive: On Freedom, Risk, and Taking Back Control) is a 2020 American non-fiction book by Matthew Crawford. Written by a self-professed "gearhead", it is written as a defense of American car culture, including: high-speed driving; amateur racing and performance driving competitions; and tinkering with, souping up and rebuilding old cars. It also includes polemics against the growing deployment of self-driving cars, excessive automation in vehicles, automated traffic enforcement, centrally planned traffic management and Cash for Clunkers–style efforts to dispose of older cars. The chapters vary and include personal memoir, philosophical essays and journalistic reports. Why We Drive was received well by critics, who noted the author's argument that driving is a mechanism for individuals to develop responsibilities as self-governing citizens and that excessive development of safety features impinges on human ability to accept and manage risk.

== Background ==
Crawford studied physics at the University of California, Santa Barbara, and political philosophy at the University of Chicago and is also a self-described gearhead and "philosopher-mechanic". He previously authored Shop Class as Soulcraft (2009), a philosophical defense of manual labor, and The World Beyond Your Head (2015), a book on avoiding the perils of distraction by technology.

== Synopsis ==
Why We Drive is divided into four main sections. Each section comprises chapters in a variety ranging from journalistic reports, personal memoir, philosophical essays and polemics. In the introduction, Crawford says that while the book appeals to "driving enthusiasts" like himself, he believes readers "indifferent to the pleasures of driving" will still be provoked to "broader questions—about the fate of human agency and the prospects for democratic governance, not least." Crawford writes that he intends to "claim the problem of driving for the liberal-republican tradition of political reflection [which] holds that a people worthy of democracy must be made up of individuals capable of governing their own behavior in the first place, and have therefore earned their fellow citizens' trust."

In the first section, "Rolling Your Own", Crawford explores the physicality of driving and critiques the way modern cars interpose layers of automation (including self-driving) between the driver and the road. He praises the virtues of old cars, criticizes efforts like the Car Allowance Rebate System to dispose of older cars and the trend of "idiot-proofing" in modern car design, and describes the "folk engineering" involved in his effort to rebuild and soup up a Volkswagen Beetle. He also recounts his then-wife's experiments with teaching rats to drive as an example of the need of humans for "open project space" to solve problems. Over-automation of cars, he argues, not only creates safety risks when human drivers are less conditioned to react to emergencies, but has a "dispiriting" effect on drivers "in the way an animal does when it is removed from its accustomed habitat, the one that calls forth its full reportoire of excellences."

In the second section, "Motor Sport and the Spirit of Play", Crawford draws on Johan Huizinga's Homo Ludens to examine motor competitions as a gentlemanly form of playful combat and reports on a variety of amateur motorsports, including drifting, a demolition derby, an adult soapbox derby and a desert rally. The latter, a race that takes place in Nevada, is held up as a Tocquevilleian "school of citizenship" as a "community that generates and renews itself through speech as well as action."

The third section, "Self-Government, or Not", criticizes various ways civic authorities manage and corral drivers, including through automated traffic enforcement, reckless driving laws and centrally planned traffic management. "The need for human judgment cannot be done away with by simple rules, yet automatic speed enforcement is not sensitive to any of this," he says. Crawford praises the spontaneous order of informal rules formed by the "traffic community", which, when it comes together in urban traffic, he describes as creating "at its best an experience of civic friendship, an act of trust and solidarity that makes one proud to belong to the human race."

In the final section, "Meet the New Boss", Crawford draws on the work of Shoshana Zuboff to address the role of tech companies like Google in commercializing driving and corralling drivers through mapping technology, vehicular software, autonomous vehicles and "smart city" initiatives. He concludes with a defense of the sovereignty of ordinary drivers on roads: "To drive is to exercise one's skill at being free, and one can't help but feel this when one gets behind the wheel. If seems like a skill worth preserving."

== Reception ==
Why We Drive was well-received by critics. In The Guardian, Tim Adams called it a "vivid and heartfelt manifesto against the drift of our world, against the loss of individual agency and the human pleasure of acquired skill and calculated risk." Likewise, Ross Douthat of The New York Times described the book as "the latest installment in Crawford's running series of defenses of reality against virtuality." Kirkus Reviews also noted that Why We Drive was in continuity with Crawford's previous books. Also in continuity with Crawford's previous work, according to the Claremont Review of Books, was Crawford's emphasis on self-government: "the self-government of just controlling one's own car (and body, and life) with skill and responsibility, and the self-government on the larger scale of who decides 'what sort of regime of mobility we will inhabit.'"

Douthat expanded on this theme, noting that "the virtues involved in being a good driver—the mix of independence and cooperation, knowledge and responsibility—really are virtues well suited to citizenship in a sprawling and diverse republic." Amid a trend of younger Americans withdrawing from car culture and delaying or declining to get driver's licenses that previous generations sought eagerly—for reasons of cost of living or environmental impact—Douthat asked young non-drivers to consider Crawford's argument: "If you do not drive your neighborhood or region, what form of adult mastery and knowledge are you seeking in its place?"

Crawford makes a positive argument for the "distinctly human pleasures and travails discovered behind the wheel" and a negative argument that rejects "the 'manufactured experiences' and elements of social control that dominate our lives today", according to a review in Humanum. Adams praised the book as a corrective against the growth of omnipresent tech companies. Critics noted that Crawford distinguishes between the sense of safety that comes from social control as applied to driving and "the safety that comes from self-mastery". In The Wall Street Journal, Dave Shiflett positively highlighted Crawford's discussion of the rise in highway deaths between 2013 and 2015, which Crawford attributes to cars becoming "boring to drive", which, combined with smartphones, "result[s] in less attentive drivers". The San Francisco Chronicle added that "Why We Drive is about driving like Moby-Dick is about whaling" in that its "real subject", rather than driving itself, is "the creeping culture of 'safetyism' and its handmaiden: a cloying progressivism—abetted by tech companies for whom its moral messianism conveniently cloaks venal self-interest—intent on sanding down life’s hard edges that, for all its professed concern for our welfare, is inimical to much of what we know about human flourishing."

Reviewers observed that Crawford's book responded to assumptions about the usefulness of artificial intelligence. Adams wrote that the book critiqued "one of the more insidious assumptions of the artificial intelligence revolution that we are currently living through: the seductive idea that most people desire ease, passivity, 'frictionless' interactions with the world of objects" and noted that this assumption is in part behind the "idiot-proofing" Crawford examines. Evaluating Why We Drive in 2024, several years after its release and after the arrival of mainstream generative AI tools, Molly Black commented that the growth of AI is based on a mechanistic understanding of human reason that Crawford rejects in favor of an understanding of people as embracing playfulness and risk.

While the book was written before the COVID-19-related lockdowns in the United States, the Claremont Review of Books noted that Crawford "anticipates this experience completely in his analysis of how the 'safety-industrial complex' advances the vision of the driverless car." Car magazine also highlighted the way Crawford anticipated pandemic behavior in the United Kingdom in people's informal cooperation in public movement without the need for rules and surveillance.

The LSE Review of Books said it was disappointing that Crawford, who dismissed detractors of internal combustion engines as "carbon teetotalers", did not address in detail the climate-related effects of driving. Douthat said the book was "a little over the top" due to Crawford's defense of the democratic virtues of driving despite Crawford's identity as "a natural automotive aristocrat" who refits cars, loves high-speed driving and embeds himself in "intense auto-subcultures". Kirkus's reviewer complained that Crawford went into too much detail in the chapter on re-engineering a Volkswagen.
