= Matthew Crawford =

American writer and researcher (born 1965)

Matthew B. Crawford (born 1965) is an American writer and research fellow at the Institute for Advanced Studies in Culture at the University of Virginia.

== Early life and education ==
Crawford majored in physics as an undergraduate, then turned to political philosophy. He earned his PhD from the University of Chicago.

== Career ==
In September 2001, Crawford accepted a position as executive director of the George C. Marshall Institute, but left the institute after five months, saying that "the trappings of scholarship were used to put a scientific cover on positions arrived at otherwise. These positions served various interests, ideological or material. For example, part of my job consisted of making arguments about global warming that just happened to coincide with the positions taken by the oil companies that funded the think tank."

As of 2020 he is a research fellow at the Institute for Advanced Studies in Culture at the University of Virginia, a contributing editor at The New Atlantis, and professes to be a motorcycle mechanic.

== In film ==
Crawford appeared in the 2014 documentary Merchants of Doubt.

== Personal life ==
Crawford was married to cognitive psychologist L. Elizabeth Crawford. He has two daughters. In 2024, Crawford was remarried to Marilyn Simon in Winnipeg.

After spending his adult life as an agnostic, Crawford converted to Anglicanism at St. Margaret's Anglican Church in Winnipeg in 2023.

== Selected works ==
- Shop Class as Soulcraft: An Inquiry Into the Value of Work. Penguin Press, 2009. ISBN 978-1-59420-223-0. Published in London as The Case for Working with Your Hands. Viking, 2009. ISBN 978-0-670-91874-4.
- The World Beyond Your Head: On Becoming an Individual in an Age of Distraction. Farrar, Straus and Giroux, 2015. ISBN 978-0-374-29298-0
- Why We Drive: Toward a Philosophy of the Open Road, William Morrow, 2020. ISBN 978-0062741967
