= Naomi Oreskes =

American historian of science

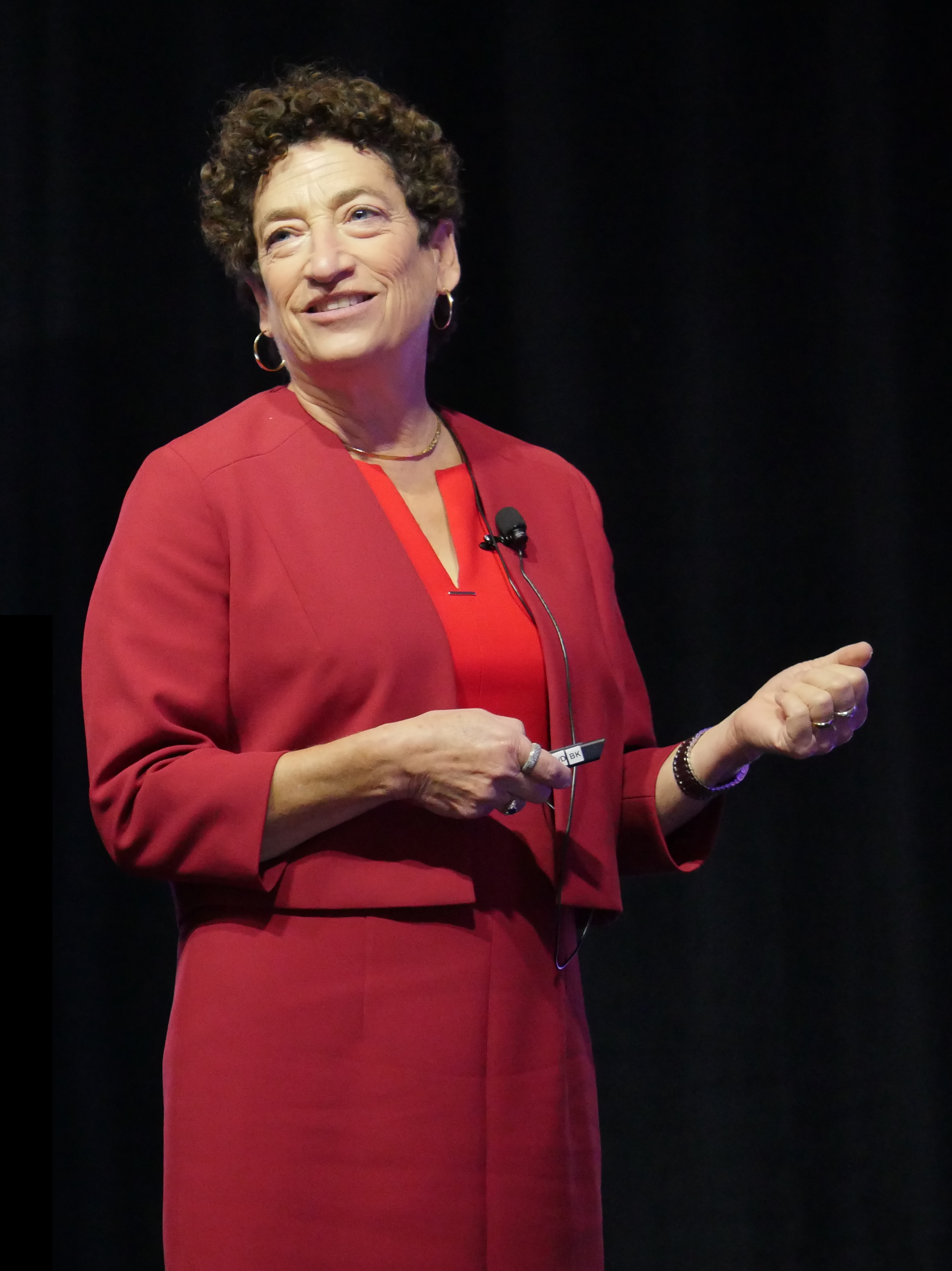
- Oreskes in 2022 at CSICon
- Born: November 25, 1958 (age 67); New York City, U.S.
- Education: Stuyvesant High School; Imperial College London (BS); Stanford University (PhD)
- Known for: Studying the cultural resonance of scientific doubt
- Relatives: Daniel Oreskes (brother); Michael Oreskes (brother)
- Scientific career
- Fields: History of science, economic geology
- Workplaces: Stanford University; U.S. Environmental Protection Agency; Dartmouth College; Harvard University; New York University; University of California, San Diego
- Doctoral advisor: Marco T. Einaudi; Peter Galison
- Other academic advisors: Nancy Cartwright; Martin J. S. Rudwick

Naomi Oreskes (/əˈrɛskəs/; born November 25, 1958) is an American historian of science.

After 15 years as Professor of History and Science Studies at the University of California, San Diego, she became professor of the history of science and affiliated professor of earth and planetary sciences at Harvard University in 2013, and in 2020 was also named the Henry Charles Lea Professor of the History of Science.

She has worked on studies of geophysics, environmental issues such as global warming, and the history of science. In 2010, Oreskes co-authored Merchants of Doubt, which identified significant parallels between the climate change debate and earlier public controversies, notably the tobacco industry's campaign to obscure the link between smoking and serious disease.

== Early life and education ==
Oreskes is the daughter of Susan Eileen (née Nagin), a teacher, and Irwin Oreskes, a professor of medical laboratory sciences and former dean of the School of Health Sciences at Hunter College in New York. She has three siblings: Michael Oreskes, a journalist; Daniel Oreskes, an actor; and Rebecca Oreskes, a writer and former U.S. Forest Service ranger. She is Jewish.

She studied at Stuyvesant High School, New York, and received her Bachelor of Science in mining geology from the Royal School of Mines of Imperial College, University of London in 1981. She later received her PhD degree in the Stanford University Graduate Special Program in Geological Research and History of Science.

== Career ==
Oreskes has worked as a consultant for the United States Environmental Protection Agency and US National Academy of Sciences, and has also taught at Dartmouth College, New York University, UCSD and Harvard University. She is the author of or has contributed to a number of essays and technical reports in economic geology and history of science in addition to several books.

=== Academics ===
Oreskes' academic career started in geology, then broadened into history and philosophy of science. Her work was concerned with scientific methods, model validation, consensus, dissent, as in 2 books on the often-misunderstood history of continental drift and plate tectonics. She later focused on climate change science and studied the doubt-creation industry opposing it.

She worked as a mining geologist for WMC (Western Mining Company) in outback South Australia, based in Adelaide.

Starting in 1984, she returned to academia as a research assistant in the Geology Department and as a teaching assistant in the departments of Geology, Philosophy and Applied Earth Sciences at Stanford University.

The 1992 Hitzman-Oreskes-Einaudi paper on Cu-U-Au-REE ("Olympic Dam") deposits has been cited more than 700 times, according to Google Scholar. She received a National Science Foundation's Young Investigator Award in 1994.

During 1991–1996, she was an Assistant Professor of Earth Sciences and Adjunct Asst. Professor of History at Dartmouth College in Hanover, New Hampshire. She spent 1996–1998 as associate professor, History and Philosophy of Science at the Gallatin School of Individualized Study, New York University.

As an example of studying scientific methods, she wrote on model validation in the Earth sciences, cited more than 3200 times according to Google Scholar.

She moved to University of California, San Diego in 1998 as associate professor in the Department of History and Program in Science Studies, then as professor in that department 2005–2013, as well as adjunct professor of Geosciences (since 2007). She was named provost of the Sixth College 2008–2011.

In 1999, she participated as a consultant to the US Nuclear Waste Technical Review Board for developing a repository safety strategy for the Yucca Mountain project, with special attention to model validation.

Since 2013, Oreskes has served as a professor at Harvard University in the Department of the History of Science and Department of Earth and Planetary Sciences (by courtesy).

Since 2017, she has been listed on the board of directors of the National Center for Science Education.

Oreskes is on the board of directors of the Climate Science Legal Defense Fund.

==== Science and society essay ====
Oreskes wrote an essay "The Scientific Consensus on Climate Change", published in the science and society section of the journal Science in December 2004.

In the essay she reported an analysis of "928 abstracts, published in refereed scientific journals between 1993 and 2003 and published in the ISI database with the keywords 'global climate change'". The essay stated the analysis was to test the hypothesis that the drafting of reports and statements by societies such as the Intergovernmental Panel on Climate Change, American Association for the Advancement of Science and National Academy of Sciences might downplay legitimate dissenting opinions on anthropogenic climate change. After the analysis, she concluded that 75 percent of the examined abstracts either explicitly or implicitly backed the consensus view, while none directly dissented from it. The essay received a great deal of media attention from around the world and has been cited by many prominent persons such as Al Gore in the movie An Inconvenient Truth.

In 2007, Oreskes expanded her analysis, stating that approximately 20 percent of abstracts explicitly endorsed the consensus on climate change that: "Earth's climate is being affected by human activities". In addition, 55 percent of abstracts "implicitly" endorsed the consensus by engaging in research to characterize the ongoing and/or future impact of climate change (50 percent of abstracts) or to mitigate predicted changes (5 percent). The remaining 25 percent focused on either paleoclimate (10%) or developing measurement techniques (15%); Oreskes did not classify these as taking a position on contemporary global climate change.

==== Merchants of Doubt ====
Merchants of Doubt is a 2010 book by Naomi Oreskes and Erik M. Conway. Oreskes and Conway, both American historians of science, identify some remarkable parallels between the climate change debate and earlier controversies over tobacco smoking, acid rain, and the hole in the ozone layer. They argue that spreading doubt and confusion was the basic strategy of those opposing action in each case. In particular, Fred Seitz, Fred Singer, and a few other contrarian scientists joined forces with conservative think tanks and private corporations to challenge the scientific consensus on many contemporary issues.

Most reviewers received it "enthusiastically". One reviewer said that Merchants of Doubt is exhaustively researched and documented and may be one of the most important books of 2010. Another reviewer saw the book as his choice for best science book of the year.

A film with the same name, inspired by the book, was released in 2015.

Other film released in 2020 was The Campaign Against the Climate, a documentary directed by the Danish journalist and filmmaker Mads Ellesøe.

== Controversies ==
Together with Erik Conway and Matthew Shindell, in 2008, Oreskes wrote the paper "From Chicken Little to Dr. Pangloss: William Nierenberg, Global Warming, and the Social Deconstruction of Scientific Knowledge" which argued that William Nierenberg as chairman reframed a National Academy of Sciences committee report on climate change in 1983 into economic terms to avoid action on the topic. Nierenberg died in 2000 but his son co-authored a rebuttal published in 2010 in the same journal which said the paper contradicted the historical report and there was no evidence that any committee members disagreed with the report; the evidence was that the report reflected the consensus at the time.

In 2015, Oreskes published an opinion piece in The Guardian, titled "There is a New Form of Climate Denialism to Look Out For – So Don't Celebrate Yet", in which she said scientists who call for a continued use of nuclear energy are renewable-energy "deniers" and "myth" makers. She cited an article by four prominent climate scientists (James Hansen, Ken Caldeira, Kerry Emanuel and Tom Wigley) saying nuclear power must be used to combat climate change. An opinion piece by Michael Specter in The New Yorker asserted that she had branded these four scientists as "climate deniers", and that her characterization was absurd, as they were among those who had done the most to push people to combat climate change.

In 2015, news outlets reported that ExxonMobil scientists had found evidence for climate change, but had nonetheless continued to raise doubts about it, a charge that Oreskes also reported. The company criticized Oreskes and invited her and the public to read approximately 187 documents written between 1977 and 2014. She and Geoffrey Supran did so, and reported their findings, which supported the original accounts, in the peer-reviewed journal Environmental Research Letters in 2017.

== Selected awards, honors, and fellowships ==
- Margaret W. Rossiter History of Women in Science Prize for "Objectivity or Heroism? On the Invisibility of Women in Science," Osiris, 1996, 11: 87–113, awarded 2000
- American Philosophical Society Sabbatical Fellowship, 2001–2002
- George Sarton Award Lecture, American Association for the Advancement of Science, 2004
- AAAS Fellow, American Association for the Advancement of Science, 2007
- Listed, Who's Who in American Science and Engineering, Who's Who in the West
- National Endowment for the Humanities Fellowship for University Teachers, 1993-94
- Chancellors Associates’ Faculty Excellence Award for Community Service UCSD 2008
- Francis Bacon Award in the History and Philosophy of Science and Technology, Caltech 2008
- Climate Change Communicator of the Year, George Mason University Center for Climate Change Communication, 2011
- Commencement Speaker University of California, Riverside 2012
- National Science Foundation Young Investigator Award, 1994–1999
- Ritter Memorial Fellowship in History of Marine Sciences, Scripps Institution of Oceanography, 1994
- Society of Economic Geologists Lindgren Prize for outstanding work by a young scientist, 1993
- Forum for the History of Science in America Distinguished Lecture History of Science Society 2014
- Herbert Feis Prize for Public History, American Historical Association 2014
- Presidential Citation for Science and Society American Geophysical Union 2014
- Elected a Fellow of the Committee for Skeptical Inquiry, 2015
- Public Service Award, Geological Society of America, 2015
- William T. Patten Visiting Lectureship, Indiana University, March 2015
- Ambassador and Fellow, American Geophysical Union, 2016
- Convocation Speaker, The Evergreen State College, Olympia and Tacoma, Washington, 2016
- Frederick Anderson Climate Change Award, Center for International Environmental Law, 2016
- Stephen H. Schneider Award for Outstanding Climate Science Communication, Climate One, 2016
- Elected Member of American Academy of Arts and Sciences, 2017
- Plenary Speaker, American Association for the Advancement of Science, 2017
- Guggenheim Fellow, 2018-2019, John Simon Guggenheim Memorial Foundation,
- Honorary degree ETH Zurich, 2018.
- Elected Member of the American Philosophical Society, 2019
- Mary C. Rabbit Award (History and Philosophy of Geology Division), Geological Society of America, 2019
- The British Academy Medal, 2019
- Honorary degree, Université libre de Bruxelles, 2023.
- TIME 100 inaugural climate leaders, 2023
- Honorary degree from Bard College 2024
- Nonino Prize, Master of Our Time, 2024
- Patrick Suppes Prize in History of Science, for Science on a Mission, American Philosophical Society, 2024
- Tyndall Lecturer in Global Environmental Change, American Geophysical Union, 2024
- Volvo Environment Prize 2025

== Selected writings ==
=== Books ===
- The Rejection of Continental Drift: Theory and Method in American Earth Science, Oxford University Press, 1999, ISBN 0-19-511733-6
- Perspectives on Geophysics, Special Issue of Studies in History and Philosophy of Modern Physics, 31B, Oreskes, Naomi and James R. Fleming, eds., 2000.
- Plate Tectonics: An Insider’s History of the Modern Theory of the Earth, Edited with Homer Le Grand, Westview Press, 2003, ISBN 0-8133-4132-9
- Merchants of Doubt: How a Handful of Scientists Obscured the Truth on Issues from Tobacco Smoke to Global Warming, Naomi Oreskes and Erik M. Conway, Bloomsbury Press, 2010
- The Collapse of Western Civilization: A View from the Future, Naomi Oreskes and Erik M. Conway, Columbia University Press, 2014
- Encyclical on Climate Change and Inequality: On Care for Our Common Home, Pope Francis, introduction by Naomi Oreskes, (Brooklyn, NY: Melville House, 2015) ISBN 978-1-612-19528-5
- Discerning Experts: The Practices of Scientific Assessment for Environmental Policy. Michael Oppenheimer, N. Oreskes, D. Jamieson, K. Brysse, J. O’Reilly & M. Shindell, University of Chicago Press, 2019, ISBN 978-0-226-60201-1
- Why Trust Science?, Princeton University Press, 2019, Edited by Stephen Macedo, ISBN 9780691179001
- Science on a Mission: How Military Funding Shaped What We Do and Don't Know about the Ocean, University of Chicago Press, 2020, ISBN 9780226732381
- The Big Myth: How American Business Taught Us to Loathe Government and Love the Free Market. Naomi Oreskes and Erik M. Conway. Bloomsbury Publishing, 2023. ISBN 978-1-635-57357-2

=== Papers ===
- Hitzman, Murray W.; Oreskes, Naomi; Einaudi, Marco T. (1992). "Geological characteristics and tectonic setting of Proterozoic iron oxide (Cu-U-Au-LREE) deposits". Precambrian Research. 58 (1–4): 241–287. Bibcode:1992PreR...58..241H. doi:10.1016/0301-9268(92)90121-4.
- Oreskes, Naomi; Shrader-Frechette, Kristin; Belitz, Kenneth (1994). "Verification, Validation, and Confirmation of Numerical Models in the Earth Sciences" (PDF). Science. 263 (5147): 641–646. Bibcode:1994Sci...263..641O. doi:10.1126/science.263.5147.641. PMID 17747657. S2CID 16428790.
- Oreskes, Naomi (December 2004). "The Scientific Consensus on Climate Change". Science. 306 (5702): 1686. doi:10.1126/science.1103618. PMID 15576594.
- Oreskes, Naomi (2004). "Science and public policy: what's proof got to do with it?" (PDF). Environmental Science & Policy. 7 (5): 369–383. Bibcode:2004ESPol...7..369O. doi:10.1016/j.envsci.2004.06.002.
- Oreskes, Naomi; Conway, Erik M. (2010). "Defeating the merchants of doubt". Nature. 465 (7299): 686–687. Bibcode:2010Natur.465..686O. doi:10.1038/465686a. PMID 20535183. S2CID 4414326.
- Brysse, Keynyn; Oreskes, Naomi; O'Reilly, Jessica; Oppenheimer, Michael (2013). "Climate change prediction: Erring on the side of least drama?". Global Environmental Change. 23 (1): 327–337. Bibcode:2013GEC....23..327B. doi:10.1016/j.gloenvcha.2012.10.008.
- Risbey; et al. (2014). "Well-estimated global surface warming in climate projections selected for ENSO phase". Nature Climate Change. 4 (9): 835–840. Bibcode:2014NatCC...4..835R. doi:10.1038/nclimate2310.
- Lewandowsky, Stephan; Oreskes, Naomi; Risbey, James S.; Newell, Ben R.; Smithson, Michael (2015). "Seepage: Climate change denial and its effect on the scientific community". Global Environmental Change. 33: 1–13. Bibcode:2015GEC....33....1L. doi:10.1016/j.gloenvcha.2015.02.013.
- Zalasiewicz, Jan; et al. (2015). "When did the Anthropocene begin? A mid-twentieth century boundary level is stratigraphically optimal" (PDF). Quaternary International. 383: 196–203. Bibcode:2015QuInt.383..196Z. doi:10.1016/j.quaint.2014.11.045. hdl:11250/2485908.
- Lewandowsky, Stephan; et al. (2016). "The "Pause" in Global Warming: Turning a Routine Fluctuation into a Problem for Science". Bulletin of the American Meteorological Society. 97 (5): 723–733. Bibcode:2016BAMS...97..723L. doi:10.1175/BAMS-D-14-00106.1. hdl:1983/9a81f4b9-c049-411b-a8fd-11acfbbc2211.
- Waters, Colin N.; et al. (2016). "The Anthropocene is functionally and stratigraphically distinct from the Holocene". Science. 351 (6269) aad2622: 6269. Bibcode:2016Sci...351.2622W. doi:10.1126/science.aad2622. PMID 26744408. S2CID 206642594.
- Oreskes, Naomi (2017). "Response by Oreskes to "Beyond Counting Climate Consensus"". Environmental Communication. 11 (6): 731–732. Bibcode:2017Ecomm..11..731O. doi:10.1080/17524032.2017.1377094. S2CID 149405262.
- Supran, Geoffrey; Oreskes, Naomi (2017). "Assessing ExxonMobil's climate change communications (1977–2014)". Environmental Research Letters. 12 (8): 084019. Bibcode:2017ERL....12h4019S. doi:10.1088/1748-9326/aa815f.
- Zalasiewicz, Jan; Waters, Colin N.; Summerhayes, Colin P.; Wolfe, Alexander P.; Barnosky, Anthony D.; Cearreta, Alejandro; Crutzen, Paul; Ellis, Erle; Fairchild, Ian J.; Gałuszka, Agnieszka; Haff, Peter; Hajdas, Irka; Head, Martin J.; Ivar do Sul, Juliana A.; Jeandel, Catherine; Leinfelder, Reinhold; McNeill, John R.; Neal, Cath; Odada, Eric; Oreskes, Naomi; Steffen, Will; Syvitski, James; Vidas, Davor; Wagreich, Michael; Williams, Mark (2017). "The Working Group on the Anthropocene: Summary of evidence and interim recommendations". Anthropocene. 19: 55–60. doi:10.1016/j.ancene.2017.09.001.
- Lewandowsky, Stephan; Cowtan; Risbey, James S.; Mann, Michael E.; Steinman, Byron E.; Oreskes, Naomi; Rahmstorf, Stefan (2018). "The 'pause' in global warming in historical context: (II) Comparing models to observations". Environmental Research Letters. 13 (12): 123007. Bibcode:2018ERL....13l3007L. doi:10.1088/1748-9326/aaf372. hdl:1983/3539ae93-74ba-4dad-9e39-44f9656fc7ad.
- Lloyd, Elisabeth A.; Oreskes, Naomi (2018). "Climate Change Attribution: When is it Appropriate to Accept New Methods?". Earth's Future. 5 (3): 311–325. Bibcode:2018EaFut...6..311L. doi:10.1002/2017EF000665.
- Cook, J.; Supran, G.; Lewandowsky, S.; Oreskes, N.; Maibach, E. (2019). America Misled: How the fossil fuel industry deliberately misled Americans about climate change (Report). Fairfax, VA: George Mason University Center for Climate Change Communication.

=== Editorials and opinion articles ===
- Oreskes, Naomi (December 26, 2004). "Undeniable global warming". The Washington Post.
- Oreskes, Naomi (July 24, 2006). "Global warming -- signed, sealed and delivered". Los Angeles Times.
- Oreskes, Naomi (February 1, 2007). "The Long Consensus On Climate Change". The Washington Post.
- Oreskes, Naomi (January 17, 2013). "Put government labs to work on climate change". The Washington Post.
- Oreskes, Naomi; Conway, Erik (July 25, 2014). "14 concepts that will be obsolete after catastrophic climate change". The Washington Post.
- Oreskes, Naomi (October 10, 2015). "Exxon's Climate Concealment". The New York Times.
- Oreskes, Naomi; Supran, Geoffrey (September 1, 2017). "Yes, ExxonMobil misled the public". Los Angeles Times.
- Supran, Geoffrey; Oreskes, Naomi (August 22, 2017). "What Exxon Mobil Didn't Say About Climate Change". The New York Times.
- Oreskes, Naomi; Conway, Erik M. (October 16, 2018). "Fixing the Climate Requires More Than Technology". The New York Times.
- Oreskes, Naomi, "History Matters to Science: It helps to explain how cynical actors undermine the truth", Scientific American, vol. 323, no. 6 (December 2020), p. 81. "In our 2010 book, Merchants of Doubt, Erik M. Conway and I showed how the same arguments [as those used to cast doubt on the link between tobacco use and lung cancer] were used to delay action on acid rain, the ozone hole and climate change – and this year [2020] we saw the spurious "freedom" argument being used to disparage mask wearing [during the COVID-19 pandemic]."
- Oreskes, Naomi & Erik M. Conway (September 2020). "The information manipulators : by moving matter and energy, innovators have democratized information". Scientific American. 323 (3): 40–46.
- Oreskes, Naomi (September 2020). "Tainted money taints research". Observatory. Scientific American. 323 (3): 81. doi:10.1038/scientificamerican1220-81. PMID 39014748.
- Oreskes, Naomi, "Breaking the Techno-Promise: We do not have enough time for nuclear power to save us from the climate crisis," Scientific American, vol. 326, no. 2 (February 2022), p. 74.
- Oreskes, Naomi, "Furious about Firearms: Outrage, not hope, will move us to prevent gun violence", Scientific American, vol. 329, no. 1 (July/August 2023), p. 96.
- Oreskes, Naomi, "Fusion's False Promise: Despite a recent advance, nuclear fusion is not the solution to the climate crisis", Scientific American, vol. 328, no. 6 (June 2023), p. 86.
- Oreskes, Naomi, "Masked Confusion: A trusted source of health information misleads the public by prioritizing rigor over reality", Scientific American, vol. 329, no. 4 (November 2023), pp. 90–91.
- Oreskes, Naomi, "Social Security and Science: Attacks on the program rest on false 'facts' similar to ones used against climate change action", Scientific American, vol. 328, no. 5 (May 2023), p. 86.
- Oreskes, Naomi, "The Eight-Billion-Person Bomb: A surging population – and the planet – cannot survive without help", Scientific American, vol. 328, no. 3 (March 2023), p. 76.

== See also ==
- Historic recurrence
- Surveys of scientists' views on climate change § Oreskes, 2004
