= Adeline Schulberg =

Russian-American talent and literary agent

- Born: Adeline Jaffe; April 14, 1895; Russian Empire
- Died: July 15, 1977 (aged 82); New York City, New York, U.S.
- Education: University of California (B.A.)
- Spouse: B. P. Schulberg (m. 1913; div. 1933)
- Children: 3, including Budd
- Relatives: Sam Jaffe (brother); Matt Tolmach (great-nephew); Jigee Viertel (daughter-in-law); Geraldine Brooks (daughter-in-law)

Adeline Jaffe Schulberg (April 14, 1895 – July 15, 1977) was a talent and literary agent who founded the Ad Schulberg Agency.

== Biography ==
She was born Adeline Jaffe to a Jewish family on April 14, 1895, in Russia, the daughter of Hannah and Max Jaffe. While she was an infant, her family immigrated to the US in order to flee the rise in anti-semitic pogroms. The family settled on Lower East Side of Manhattan. She had two older brothers, Joseph and David, and a younger brother Sam Jaffe. Her family was poor, and she became a committed socialist and personally knew many of the movement's leaders including Leon Trotsky and George Sokolsky. She worked in the suffrage movement which enabled her to get her husband, B.P. Schulberg, then an agent with Adolph Zukor’s Famous Players–Lasky, a job producing a film documentary about English suffragist leader Sylvia Pankhurst. In 1918, she and her husband moved to Los Angeles where her husband took a job as a producer at Paramount Pictures while Schulberg became an activist for child welfare, education, woman's rights, and promoting birth control by helping to establish birth control clinics throughout the West. In 1926, she graduated with a B.A. from the University of California. In 1929, she helped to found the first progressive school in California based on the principles of John Dewey. In 1932, she founded the Schulberg-Feldman talent agency with Charles K. Feldman which was soon joined by her brother Sam Jaffe and Noll Gurney.

After her divorce from her husband in 1933, she established her own talent agency named the Ad Schulberg Agency which represented some of the biggest stars at the time including Marlene Dietrich, Fredric March, and Herbert Marshall. In the 1930s, she sold the agency and then moved to London where she set up another talent agency (she was forbidden to operate in the US due to a non-compete agreement); during World War II, she operated an "underground railroad" that assisted Jewish refugee talent to flee from Nazi-occupied Europe. After the war, she moved back to New York City and worked as a talent scout for Columbia Pictures where she discovered Shelley Winters; she then formed her own literary agency where she represented her son Budd Schulberg, Vicki Baum, Fannie Hurst, Ruth McKenney, Roger Price, Mark Harris, and Rex Reed.

== Personal life ==
In 1913, Schulberg was married to then New York World reporter, B.P. Schulberg; they had a son Budd Schulberg before divorcing in 1933. She died in New York City on July 15, 1977. Her son was married and divorced from actresses Virginia Lee Ray (known as Jigee Viertel) and Geraldine Brooks.
