= The Gersh Agency =

American talent and literary agency

Gersh
- Type: Private
- Industry: Talent agency
- Founded: 1949; 77 years ago in Beverly Hills, California, US
- Headquarters: Beverly Hills, California, US
- Key people: Leslie Siebert (President), Bob Gersh and David Gersh (Co-chairs)
- Number of employees: About 600 (2024)
- Website: gersh.com

Gersh (also known as The Gersh Agency) is an American entertainment and sports agency headquartered in Beverly Hills, California, New York City, and Madrid, with offices and representatives in 16 countries.

Established in 1949 by Phil Gersh, the company was wholly owned by the Gersh family until 2023, when a minority interest was sold to Crestview Partners, a private equity company. The agency is currently run by Leslie Siebert, as President, with Phil Gersh's sons, Bob and David, serving as co-chairs.

== History ==
Gersh was founded in Beverly Hills in 1949 by Phil Gersh. He was considered one of the last links between Hollywood's Golden Age and today's corporate-owned movie business, and his clients included Humphrey Bogart, David Niven, and Richard Burton. In 1965, Phil Gersh was able to purchase the agency's Beverly Hills office with his fee for representing Robert Wise, director of The Sound of Music.

Phil Gersh gradually handed over responsibility to his two sons, Bob and David Gersh but continued to play a role in the company's management until 10 weeks before his death in 2004. Richard Arlook was working at the agency from 1990 until 2008.

In 2010, Gersh purchased literary agent Hohman, Maybank, Lieb.

In 2016, the Agency for the Performing Arts (APA) sued Gersh, alleging that Gersh had poached an APA agent who had just renewed their contract.

On 4 July 2018, Gersh notified actor James Woods by email that they would no longer represent him. Woods accused the agency of liberal political bias due to his outspoken conservative views.

In 2019, agents Roy Ashton, David Rubin, and Shan Roy came under fire after cancelling a studio meeting of a former client who had left them during the WGA/ATA conflict. In response to the immediate criticism, the agency said it was "just following protocol", which drew further ire within the industry.

In 2023, Gersh sold a 45% stake to investment firm Crestview Partners, and Leslie Siebert was named as a third co-president. Until this sale, the company had been wholly owned by the Gersh family for nearly 75 years.

In 2024, Gersh began a global expansion plan, acquiring the digital and unscripted departments of A3 Artists Agency, along with more than 25 agents, 45 additional staff members, and hundreds of clients. The company also brought in new senior executives in the Business Affairs, Communications, and HR departments, and a number of agents from other companies. In June 2024, the company announced that it had created the new role of Head of Affiliate Marketing, and was promoting staff in its digital division and elsewhere in the agency.

In December 2024, Gersh acquired You First, an international sports and entertainment agency based in Madrid, acquiring its roster of clients in the sports industry. The acquisition doubled the size of Gersh, establishing its presence in offices in 14 countries, and launched the company's new Gersh Sports division. In March 2025, Tandem Sports + Entertainment rebranded as Gersh Sports, becoming the agency's basketball division and first pillar of the newly formed Gersh Sports practice.

In May 2025, the agency launched Gersh Voice to represent voice actors working in animation, podcasts, and audiobooks.

In November 2025, Gersh notified actress Dasha Nekrasova that they would no longer represent her after Nick Fuentes appeared as a guest on the podcast Red Scare which she co-hosts with Anna Khachiyan.

== Gersh Spike Lee Fellows ==
In 2023, Gersh partnered with client Spike Lee and the Atlanta University Center Consortium (AUCC)—consisting of three Historically Black Colleges and Universities: Morehouse College, Spelman College, and Clark Atlanta University—to launch the Spike Fellows at Gersh program. The initiative is designed to nurture creative undergraduate students from AUCC with interest in the entertainment industry.

In 2024, the second class of Spike Fellows hosted the inaugural Spike Fellows' Young Black Hollywood Mixer, a networking event for young Black people working in the industry.

== Other education partnerships ==
In 2025, Gersh began cooperating with Pace University, Emerson College and the Savannah College of Art and Design on an educational initiative, "Gersh U", providing campus-based programs for college students hoping to work in the entertainment industry. Gersh also hosted a panel at the 2025 SCAD Savannah Film Festival.
