= Ken LaCorte =

Former Fox News executive (born 1965)

- Born: February 5, 1965 (age 61); Alhambra, California, U.S.
- Education: Claremont McKenna College; State University of New York
- Occupations: Media executive, journalist, YouTuber
- Partner: Claudia Cowan (2024–present)

YouTube information
- Channel: Elephants in Rooms - Ken LaCorte
- Years active: 2023–present
- Genres: Informational; Factual; Education; Politics; History
- Subscribers: 931 thousand
- Views: 100.5 million
- Last updated: August 27, 2026
- Website: kenlacorte.substack.com

Ken LaCorte (born February 5, 1965) is an American media executive, journalist, businessman, and YouTuber. He was an executive at Fox News for over eighteen years, joining in 1999 as Western Region bureau chief before rising to head of news editorial (2003) and vice president/senior executive producer of FoxNews.com (2006–2016), where he oversaw all editorial content and digital operations.

After leaving Fox, he founded LaCorte News, a digital outlet he described as intended to "restore trust in journalism". He operated the partisan sites Conservative Edition News and Liberal Edition News which were accused of using clickbait content to drive traffic to fund LaCorte News.

== Early life and education ==
LaCorte's grandparents lived in a small village in Sicily. He was born in Alhambra, California, on February 5, 1965. He was named after his uncle Ken, who, according to LaCorte, was "shot to death by Nazis" in the final years of the Second World War.

He attended Claremont McKenna College and earned a bachelor's degree in government in 1987. He received a master’s degree in professional studies in 1988 from the State University of New York.

== Career ==
=== Media and marketing ===
LaCorte began his career as a communications specialist. In the late 1980s and early 1990s, he worked as a media consultant for companies and political candidates in the United States and internationally, including presidential campaigns in Colombia, Guatemala, and Venezuela. In 1997, he was the marketing manager for Healthline Medical.

=== Politics ===
In 1998, he ran as a Republican primary candidate in California's 44th State Assembly District. The Los Angeles Times reported that he was a member of the National Rifle Association of America and opposed stricter gun control legislation with the exception of handguns for felons and automatic weapons. In 1997, he challenged California law by publishing the state's Megan's Law list. Despite a warning from the state's Attorney General Dan Lungren, LaCorte hand copied the names of the state's high risk sex offenders and published them online. In 2004, California published the Megan's Law database on the internet.

=== Fox News ===
LaCorte worked in senior management for Fox News Channel for nearly two decades. He became the Bureau Chief for the channel's western region in 1998 and the Director of News Editorial in 2003. LaCorte was made the Vice President of Fox News Digital in 2006 where he oversaw editorial content of the website. The network sent him to Gaza City in 2006 to press for the release of kidnapped Fox News journalists Steve Centanni and Olaf Wiig. During his tenure at Fox News Digital, the site underperformed against CNN even while Fox News Channel dominated the cable news ratings.

LaCorte was one of network chief Roger Ailes's most trusted employees. He was part of Ailes's "Black Room," a secret unit used to conduct surveillance on Fox News employees and perceived rivals of the network. Websites were set up to attack reporters, and private investigators were dispatched to follow journalists and prepare dossiers that would be leaked to blogs such as "Cable Game." LaCorte engaged in negative PR campaigns to promote Ailes's personal grievances against journalists and Fox News critics.

==== Alleged Fox News Trump-Daniels cover-up ====
In March 2019, Jane Mayer reported in The New Yorker that Fox News reporter Diana Falzone had the story of the Stormy Daniels–Donald Trump scandal before the 2016 election, but that LaCorte told her, "Good reporting, kiddo. But Rupert [Murdoch] wants Donald Trump to win. So just let it go," and the story was killed. LaCorte denied making the statement to Falzone and said he killed the story because the evidence was not there, saying, "I was the person who made the call. I didn't run it upstairs to Roger Ailes or others .... I didn't do it to protect Donald Trump," adding "[Falzone] had put up a story that just wasn't anywhere close to being something I was comfortable publishing" and pointing to ways he said Falzone's article failed to meet his journalistic standards of verification. Nik Richie, who claimed to be one of the sources for the Falzone story, called LaCorte's account "complete bullshit," adding "Fox News was culpable. I voted for Trump, and I like Fox, but they did their own 'catch and kill' on the story to protect him." Both Falzone and LaCorte argued that Fox News should lift the NDA so the full story could come out.

In 2022, LaCorte defended his decision, saying that Daniels and Falzone were not interested in publishing the scandal but were using the media to extort Trump. According to him, Daniels refused to go on record and, after Trump paid her, avoided media outlets. He said the criticism directed at him and Fox was unjustified and pointed to other outlets that did not cover the story. He added that Trump was innocent and that Daniels should be in prison.

=== LaCorte News ===
At the end of 2016, LaCorte was pushed out of Fox News during the post-Ailes "corporate purge". With a $1 million investment, he partnered with John Moody, a former Fox News executive and longtime Ailes ally, to form LaCorte News in 2018. LaCorte also recruited former NPR editorial director and New York Times editor Michael Oreskes to join him at LaCorte News with the stated goal of "restoring faith in media." John Moody left Fox after posting a racially inflammatory column, and Michael Oreskes was ousted from an executive position at NPR due to alleged sexual harassment.

In November 2019, a New York Times report alleged that LaCorte used "Russian tactics" to push inflammatory content on the websites Conservative Edition News and Liberal Edition News, which he controlled. LaCorte's ownership of the sites was not publicly known until the NYT investigation, conducted jointly with the Virginia security firm Nisos. The investigation found that the sites repeatedly published false news and hyperbolic content designed to inflame political tensions, and concluded that "the adoption of Russian tactics by profit-motivated Americans had made it much harder to track disinformation." LaCorte defended the operation, saying he ran the partisan sites to drive traffic and raise revenue for his centrist outlet LaCorte News, stating, "I wanted to try to find middle ground." He acknowledged hiring Macedonian writers from Veles, a town described by reporters as "home to a collection of writers who churned out disinformation during the 2016 presidential election in the United States."

In late November 2019, the Facebook pages for Conservative Edition News and Liberal Edition News were shut down for terms of service violations that included manipulation of site privileges and engagement with Macedonian "troll farms". The shutdown effectively ended LaCorte News.

==== Hunter Biden laptop story ====
In October 2020, LaCorte was among the first to publish material from the Hunter Biden laptop. According to The Daily Beast, repair shop owner John Paul Mac Isaac contacted LaCorte through Fox News connections, despite Mac Isaac's stated preference that law enforcement investigate the contents of the laptop. On October 15, 2020, LaCorte released 29 PDFs he said contained emails from Hunter Biden's iCloud account. Metadata from the archive showed the files containing copies of these emails – but not the emails themselves – were created the evening of October 14, after the story had already been published by New York Post.

==== Ties to Rumen Naumovski ====
In October 2025, Rolling Stone reported that Rumen Naumovski, a Macedonian citizen who had never visited the United States, had previously worked for LaCorte. Naumovski operates the X accounts Defiant L's and Resist the Mainstream, which together have more than two million followers and have been amplified by figures including Elon Musk, Nancy Mace, Mike Lee, Ron Watkins and Eli Crane. Both accounts focus on American politics, frequently alleging corruption and election fraud by Democrats. LaCorte has publicly described Naumovski as a close friend and has written about Naumovski's attempts to emigrate.

== Personal life ==
LaCorte was born in Alhambra, California, and grew up in Arcadia, California. Since at least 2024, he has been in a long-term relationship with Claudia Cowan, Fox News's senior correspondent. Both are divorced with grown children.

LaCorte is a regular participant of Burning Man, an annual week-long desert event in Northwestern Nevada; he is set to participate in it for the eleventh time in 2026.

In February 1976, LaCorte's sister Cathy LaCorte and her boyfriend Bob Morton were murdered while hiking near Arcadia. The killer, Richard Johnson, was convicted of two counts of first-degree murder. The experience led LaCorte's family to become active in California's victims' rights movement, advocating for parole reform and contributing to the passage of Proposition 8 (1982), the Victim's Bill of Rights.
