= Daniel Oreskes =

American actor

- Born: Daniel Robert Oreskes; March 6, 1956 (age 70)
- Education: University of Pennsylvania (BA); London Academy of Music and Dramatic Art
- Occupation: Actor
- Years active: 1993–present
- Spouse: Elizabeth Small (m. 1998)
- Relatives: Naomi Oreskes (sister); Michael Oreskes (brother)

Daniel Oreskes (born March 6, 1956) is an American actor, known for his roles in Law & Order and Law & Order: Organized Crime. Oreskes has also appeared in numerous Broadway productions and narrates audiobooks.

Oreskes graduated from the University of Pennsylvania and the London Academy of Music and Dramatic Art. He is the brother of academic Naomi Oreskes and journalist Michael Oreskes.

== Filmography ==
=== Film ===
Year	Title	Role	Notes
1993	Manhattan by Numbers	Dan	
1997	The Devil's Advocate	Arnold Merto	
1999	The Thomas Crown Affair	Petru	
2003	Happy End	2nd Casting Director	
2007	The Warrior Class	Vito	Direct-to-video
2007	Day Zero	Gus	
2008	Off Jackson Avenue	Ivan	
2008	Uncertainty	Dmitri 2	
2011	Coming Up Roses	Gerry	
2019	Abe	Ari	
2024	A Real Pain	Mark	

=== Television ===
Year	Title	Role	Notes
1995	New York News	Unknown role	Episode: "Cost of Living"
1995–2007	Law & Order	Various	6 episodes
2000–2001	Courage the Cowardly Dog	Various voices	13 episodes
2001	The Sopranos	Principal Cincotta	Episodes: "Army of One", "The Telltale Moozadell"
2004	Third Watch	Mr. Bukhari	Episode: "Sins of the Fathers"
2005	Slavery and the Making of America	Thomas Jefferson	Episode: "Liberty in the Air"
2005–2008	Law & Order: Criminal Intent	Various	3 episodes
2010	The Good Wife	Ray Ernesto	Episode: "Running"
2011	Rescue Me	Garry Balsbaugh	Episode: "Head"
2012	Pan Am	Yuri	Episode: "Diplomatic Relations"
2014	Believe	Mr. Balfour	Episode: "Together"
2014	Dead of Night	Narrator	Episode: "Favorite Son"
2014	The Blacklist	Teddy Russo	Episode: "Dr. James Covington (No. 89)"
2014	Madam Secretary	General Kolba	Episode: "Need to Know"
2015	Show Me a Hero	Charles Cola	2 episodes
2015	Blue Bloods	Alan Murtaugh	Episode: "Rush to Judgement"
2016	Elementary	Lloyd Springer	Episode: "Ready or Not"
2016	Falling Water	Taka's Police Captain	Episode: "Don't Tell Bill"
2019	The Code	Brigadier General Coburn	Episode: "Blowed Up"
2019–2020	Ray Donovan	Shaman	3 episodes
2020	Bull	Judge Greene	Episode: "My Corona"
2021	And Just Like That...	Mr. Kouimelis	Episode: "Some of My Best Friends"
2021–2022	Law & Order: Organized Crime	NYPD Lieutenant Moennig	10 episodes
2021–2022	Only Murders in the Building	Marv	6 episodes
2022	The Marvelous Mrs. Maisel	Terrence	Episode: "Maisel vs. Lennon: The Cut Contest"
2024–2025	Elsbeth	Detective Buzz Fleming	6 episodes
2025	Mountainhead	Dr. Phipps	Television film

=== Video games ===
Year	Title	Role	Notes
2006	Grand Theft Auto: Vice City Stories	Bryan Forbes	Voice
