= Michael Oreskes =

American journalist (born 1954)

- Born: May 26, 1954 (age 72); New York City, New York, U.S.
- Education: City College of New York (BA)
- Occupation: Journalist
- Spouse: Geraldine Baum (m. 1989)
- Children: 1
- Relatives: Naomi Oreskes (sister); Daniel Oreskes (brother)

Michael Oreskes (/oʊˈrɛskəs/; born May 26, 1954) is an American journalist who worked at the New York Daily News and for 20 years at The New York Times. Oreskes later became the vice president and senior managing editor at the Associated Press before joining NPR as senior vice president of news and editorial director in 2015. Oreskes was ousted in 2017 amid allegations of sexual harassment.

== Early life and education ==
Oreskes was born to Susan and Irwin Oreskes. His father was a professor of medical laboratory sciences and former dean of the School of Health Sciences at Hunter College, City University of New York; his mother was a teacher. He has three siblings: Naomi Oreskes, a historian of science; Daniel Oreskes, an actor; and Rebecca Oreskes, a writer and former U.S. Forest Service ranger.

Oreskes graduated from Stuyvesant High School. He earned his Bachelor of Arts from the City College of New York in 1975. While at CCNY, he wrote for the student newspaper, The Campus.

== Journalism career ==
Oreskes covered City Hall at the New York Daily News before joining the New York Times in 1981. In 1988, he won the Silurians Award for News Analyses for his presidential campaign coverage. Oreskes remained at the Times until 2005, serving at various times as Chief Political Correspondent, Metropolitan Editor, City Editor, Washington Bureau Chief, and from 2001 to 2005 as Deputy Managing Editor/Assistant Managing Editor.

From 2005 to 2008, Oreskes was executive editor of the International Herald Tribune. He then joined the Associated Press, spending seven years there before joining NPR in 2015.

Oreskes received three Emmy Awards and an Alfred I. duPont–Columbia University Award for documentary television production. In 1999, he was awarded the Townsend Harris Medal by CCNY, and in 2000 he was inducted into the CCNY Communications Alumni Hall of Fame. He is co-author, with Eric Lane, of The Genius of America, How the Constitution Saved Our Country and Why It Can Again (2007).

In 2018, former Fox News executive Ken LaCorte recruited Oreskes and former Fox News executive editor John Moody to launch LaCorte News, "a digital news startup with the stated goal of restoring faith in media." A November 2019 New York Times report alleged that LaCorte was using "Russian tactics" to disseminate divisive content via websites he covertly controlled.

== Sexual harassment allegations ==
In October 2017, three women accused Oreskes of sexual harassment. Two of the alleged incidents occurred in the 1990s while Oreskes was Washington, D.C., bureau chief for The New York Times; a third occurred in 2015 while he was employed by NPR. He was accused of forcibly kissing the two women during his Times tenure, and asking invasive and sexual questions during a three-hour lunch during the NPR meeting, pursuing one through a personals advertisement. When confronted by one of the women about kissing her and putting his tongue in her mouth, he was said to have responded, "I was overcome with passion. I couldn't help myself." He was reprimanded privately by NPR management and was warned repeatedly about his behavior, but continued to behave inappropriately toward women.

On October 31, 2017, following a Washington Post article on the allegations of misconduct at the Times, Oreskes was placed on an indefinite leave from his position at NPR. NPR's chief executive Jarl Mohn said that action was taken because of a previously unpublicized allegation of harassment concerning a current employee. Oreskes resigned the next day at Mohn's request, writing, "I am deeply sorry to the people I hurt. My behavior was wrong and inexcusable, and I accept full responsibility." He was denied severance or separation benefits, and reimbursed NPR $1,800 in expense account charges related to his meetings with women.

The Post subsequently reported that NPR had earlier ignored multiple sexual abuse allegations against Oreskes for two years, and that NPR's handling of Oreskes had prompted a "virtual rebellion" among staffers. Staffers told CNN's Brian Stelter that Oreskes created an oppressive atmosphere by abusing his position to meet young women. Mohn conceded he failed to act fast enough. A report by the law firm Morgan Lewis discussed Oreskes' pursuit of dates using NPR-financed meals, ostensibly to discuss their careers, but the conversations often veered into personal or sexual subjects. The probe found that some women warned younger women not to be alone with him, and staff distrust of management to address problems such as Oreskes' behavior; the report offered recommendations. Other women Oreskes allegedly harassed later surfaced. The Post reported that five more women at NPR had filed formal harassment complaints against Oreskes, bringing the number who have accused him of misconduct to eight. Mohn later apologized in a note to NPR staff, saying that he had failed to "see the bigger pattern of poor judgment and unacceptable behavior." More than 100 Associated Press staffers signed a petition demanding that management "take active steps to seek out anyone who was subjected to inappropriate behavior by Oreskes during his tenure with the company."

Keith Woods, NPR's vice president for newsroom training and diversity, said revelations of sexual harassment by Oreskes resulted in a "months-long organizational trauma". David Folkenflik and Mary Louise Kelly, both of NPR, received the 2018 Ethics in Journalism Awards from the Society of Professional Journalists for their reporting on the Oreskes scandal within their own organization.

== Personal life ==
In 1989, Oreskes married journalist Geraldine Baum, who at the time was a reporter for Newsday. Their son, Ben Oreskes, also a journalist, has worked for Politico and the Los Angeles Times.
