= Erik M. Conway =

American historian (born 1965)

Erik Meade Conway (born 1965) is the historian at NASA's Jet Propulsion Laboratory at the California Institute of Technology in Pasadena. He is the author of several books. He previously completed a Ph.D. from the University of Minnesota in 1998, with a dissertation on the development of aircraft landing aids.

In High-Speed Dreams (2005), Conway argues that U.S. government sponsorship of supersonic commercial transportation systems resulted from Cold War concerns about a loss of technological prowess in the modern world. Realizing the Dream of Flight (2006) consists of eleven essays on individuals prepared in honor of the one hundredth anniversary of the Wright brothers' first powered flight. Conway also wrote Blind Landings (2007) and he is a co-author of a secondary-level education text entitled Science and Exploration (2007). Atmospheric Science at NASA was published in 2008.

His 2010 book Merchants of Doubt was co-authored with Naomi Oreskes, as was his article in the Winter 2013 issue of Daedalus called The Collapse of Western Civilization: A View from the Future.

== Bibliography ==
- High-Speed Dreams (2005)
- Realizing the Dream of Flight (2006)
- Exploration and Science: Social Impact and Interaction (Science and Society), Co-authors: by Michael Sean Reidy, Gary Kroll (2006) ISBN 1576079856
- Blind Landings (2007)
- Science and Exploration (2007)
- Atmospheric Science at NASA (2008) ISBN 1421401630
- Merchants of Doubt (co-author: Naomi Oreskes; 2010) ASIN B003RRXXO8
- The Collapse of Western Civilization: A View from the Future (Daedalus, 2013) ISBN 0231537956
- The Big Myth: How American Business Taught Us to Loathe Government and Love the Free Market (co-authors: Naomi Oreskes; Bloomsbury, 2023) ISBN 1635573580
- Oreskes, Naomi & Erik M. Conway (September 2020). "The information manipulators : by moving matter and energy, innovators have democratized information". Scientific American. 323 (3): 40–46.
