= Merchants of Doubt =

2010 book by Naomi Oreskes and Erik M. Conway

Merchants of Doubt: How a Handful of Scientists Obscured the Truth on Issues from Tobacco Smoke to Global Warming
- Author: Naomi Oreskes, Erik M. Conway
- Subject: Scientists—Professional Ethics; Science news—Moral and ethical aspects
- Published: June 3, 2010 Bloomsbury Press
- Pages: 355 pp.
- ISBN: 978-1-59691-610-4
- OCLC: 461631066
- Dewey Decimal: 174.95
- LC Class: Q147 .O74 2010

Merchants of Doubt: How a Handful of Scientists Obscured the Truth on Issues from Tobacco Smoke to Global Warming is a 2010 non-fiction book by American historians of science Naomi Oreskes and Erik M. Conway. It identifies parallels between the global warming controversy and earlier controversies over tobacco smoking, acid rain, DDT, and the hole in the ozone layer.

Oreskes and Conway write that, in each case, the overall strategy of those opposing action is to "keep the controversy alive" by continuing to spread doubt and confusion long after a scientific consensus has been reached. In particular, they show that Fred Seitz, Fred Singer, and a few other contrarian scientists joined forces with conservative think tanks and private corporations to challenge the scientific consensus on a wide variety of contemporary issues.

Some of the book's subjects have been critical of the book, but most reviewers received it favorably. It was made into a film, Merchants of Doubt, directed by Robert Kenner, released in 2014.

== Summary ==
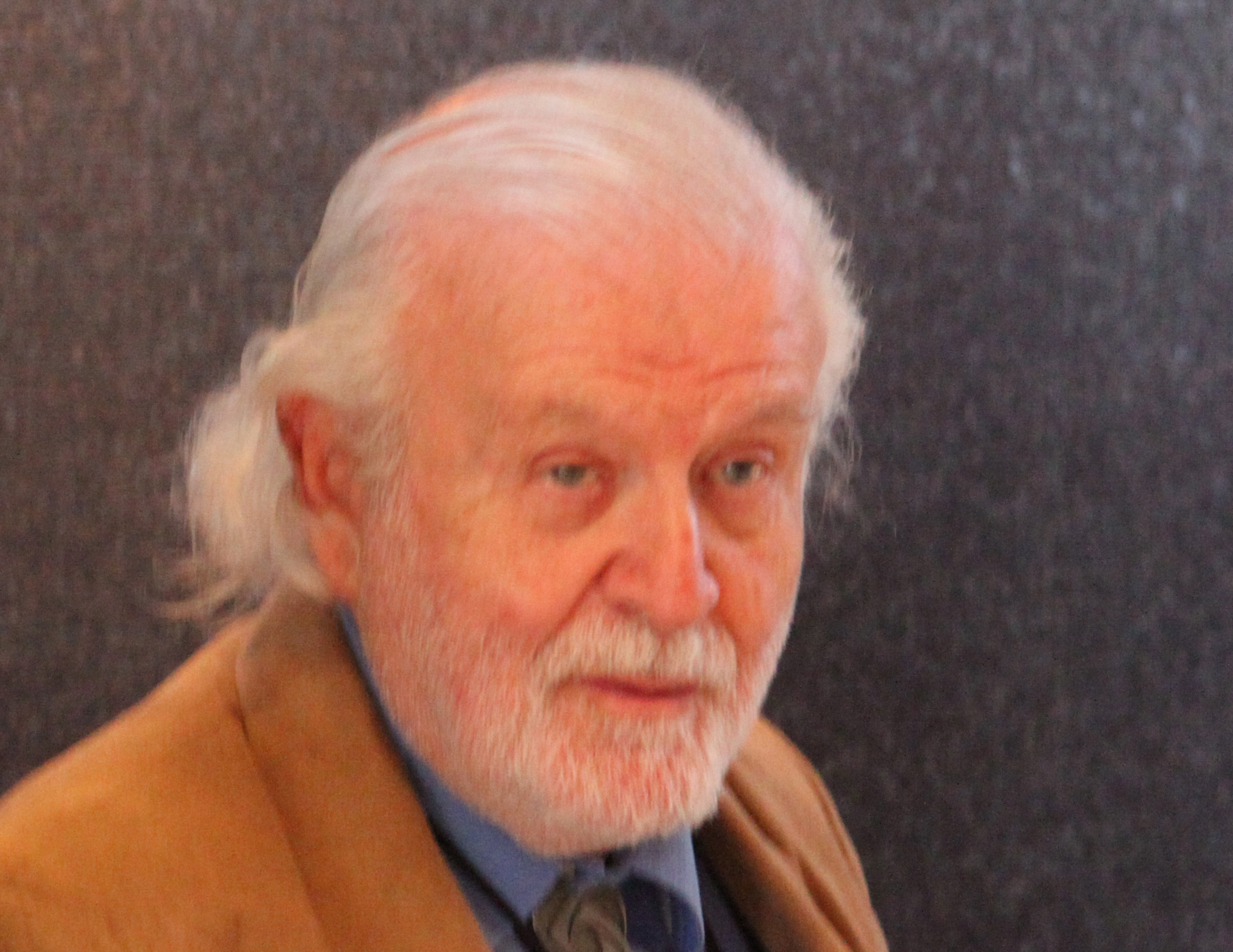
Fred Singer (2011), a prominent opponent of greenhouse gas regulation

Oreskes and Conway write that a handful of politically conservative scientists, with strong ties to particular industries, have "played a disproportionate role in debates about controversial questions". The authors write that this has resulted in "deliberate obfuscation" of the issues which has had an influence on public opinion and policy-making.

The book criticizes the so-called Merchants of Doubt, some predominantly American science key players, above all Bill Nierenberg, Fred Seitz, and Fred Singer. All three are physicists: Singer was a space and satellite researcher, whereas Nierenberg and Seitz worked on the atomic bomb. They have been active on topics like acid rain, tobacco smoking, global warming and pesticides. The book says that these scientists have challenged and diluted the scientific consensus in the various fields, as of the dangers of smoking, the effects of acid rain, the existence of the "ozone hole", and the existence of anthropogenic climate change. Seitz and Singer have been involved with institutions such as the Heritage Foundation, the Competitive Enterprise Institute, and the George C. Marshall Institute in the United States. Funded by corporations and conservative foundations, these organizations have opposed many forms of state intervention or regulation of U.S. citizens. The book lists similar tactics in each case: "discredit the science, disseminate false information, spread confusion, and promote doubt."

The book states that Seitz, Singer, Nierenberg and Robert Jastrow were all fiercely anti-communist and they viewed government regulation as a step towards socialism and communism. The authors argue that, with the collapse of the Soviet Union, they looked for another great threat to free market capitalism and found it in environmentalism. They feared that an over-reaction to environmental problems would lead to heavy-handed government intervention in the marketplace and intrusion into people's lives. Oreskes and Conway state that the longer the delay the worse these problems get, and the more likely it is that governments will need to take the draconian measures that conservatives and market fundamentalists most fear. They say that Seitz, Singer, Nierenberg and Jastrow denied the scientific evidence, contributed to a strategy of delay, and thereby helped to bring about the situation they most dreaded. The authors have a strong doubt about the ability of the media to differentiate between false truth and the actual science in question; however, they stop short of endorsing censorship in the name of science. According to the authors, the journalistic norm of balanced reporting has been undermined to amplify the misleading messages of the contrarians through false balance. Oreskes and Conway state: "small numbers of people can have large, negative impacts, especially if they are organised, determined and have access to power".

The main conclusion of the book is that there would have been more progress in policy making if not for the influence of the contrarian "experts", who tried for ideological reasons to undermine trust in the science base for regulation. Similar conclusions were already drawn, among others on Frederick Seitz and William Nierenberg in the book Requiem for a Species: Why We Resist the Truth about Climate Change (2010) by Australian academic Clive Hamilton.

== Reception ==
Most reviewers received Merchants of Doubt enthusiastically.

Philip Kitcher in Science says that Naomi Oreskes and Erik Conway are "two outstanding historians". He calls Merchants of Doubt a "fascinating and important study". Kitcher says that the apparently harsh claims against Nierenberg, Seitz, and Singer are "justified through a powerful dissection of the ways in which prominent climate scientists, such as Roger Revelle and Ben Santer, were exploited or viciously attacked in the press".

In The Christian Science Monitor, Will Buchanan says that Merchants of Doubt is exhaustively researched and documented, and may be one of the most important books of 2010. Oreskes and Conway are seen to demonstrate that the doubt merchants are not "objective scientists" as the term is popularly understood. Instead, they are "science-speaking mercenaries" hired by corporations to process numbers to prove that the corporations' products are safe and useful. Buchanan says they are salesmen, not scientists.

Bud Ward published a review of the book in The Yale Forum on Climate and the Media. He wrote that Oreskes and Conway use a combination of thorough scholarly research combined with writing reminiscent of the best investigative journalism, to "unravel deep common links to past environmental and public health controversies". In terms of climate science, the authors leave "little doubt about their disdain for what they regard as the misuse and abuse of science by a small cabal of scientists they see as largely lacking in requisite climate science expertise".

Phil England writes in The Ecologist that the strength of the book is the rigour of the research and the detailed focus on key incidents. He said, however, that the climate change chapter is only 50 pages long, and recommends several other books for readers who want to get a broader picture of this aspect: Jim Hoggan's Climate Cover-Up, George Monbiot's Heat: How to Stop the Planet Burning and Ross Gelbspan's The Heat is On and Boiling Point. England also said that there is little coverage about the millions of dollars which ExxonMobil has put into funding groups actively involved in promoting climate change denial and doubt.

A review in The Economist calls this a powerful book which articulates the politics involved and the degree to which scientists have sometimes manufactured and exaggerated environmental uncertainties, but opines that the authors fail to fully explain how environmental action has still often proved possible despite countervailing factors.

Robert N. Proctor, who coined the term "agnotology" to describe the study of culturally induced ignorance or doubt, wrote in American Scientist that Merchants of Doubt is a detailed and artfully written book. He set it in the context of other books which cover the "history of manufactured ignorance": David Michaels's Doubt is their Product (2008), Chris Mooney's The Republican War on Science (2009), David Rosner and Gerald Markowitz's Deceit and Denial (2002), and his own book Cancer Wars (1995).

Robin McKie in The Guardian states that Oreskes and Conway deserve considerable praise for exposing the influence of a small group of Cold War ideologues whose tactic of spreading doubt confused the public on a series of key scientific issues such as global warming on which there was a consesus. McKie says that Merchants of Doubt includes detailed notes on all sources used, is carefully paced, and is "my runaway contender for best science book of the year."

Sociologist Reiner Grundmann's review in BioSocieties journal, acknowledges that the book is well researched and factually based, but criticizes the book as being written in a black-and-white manner whereas historians should write a more nuanced description. The book depicts special interests and contrarians misleading the public as being mainly responsible for stopping action on policy. He says this shows a lack of basic understanding of the political process and the mechanisms of knowledge policy, because the authors assume that public policy would follow on from an understanding of the science. While the book provides "all the [formal] hallmarks of science", Grundmann sees it less as a scholarly work than a passionate attack and overall as a problematic book.

== Authors ==
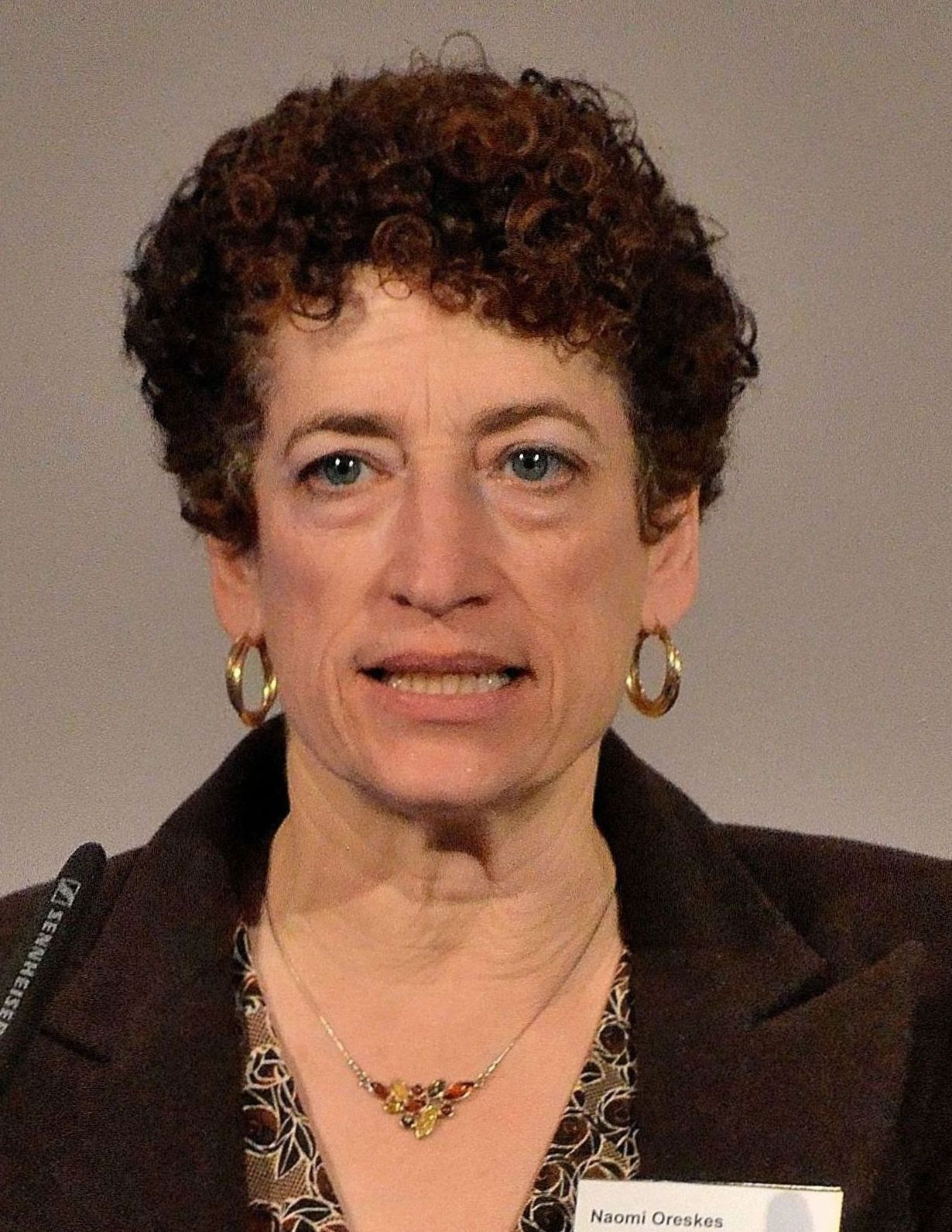
Naomi Oreskes (2015), co-author of Merchants of Doubt

Naomi Oreskes is a professor of history and science studies at Harvard University. She has degrees in geological science and a PhD in geological research and the history of science. Her work came to public attention in 2004 with the publication of "The Scientific Consensus on Climate Change," in Science, in which she wrote that there was no significant disagreement in the scientific community about the reality of global warming from human causes. Erik M. Conway is the historian at NASA's Jet Propulsion Laboratory at the California Institute of Technology in Pasadena.

== See also ==
- Climate change controversy
- Climate change policy of the United States
- Fear, uncertainty and doubt
- Greenhouse Mafia
- Health effects of tobacco
- List of books about the politics of science
- Scientific consensus on climate change
- Manufactured controversy
- Media coverage of climate change
- Scientific consensus
- Tobacco control movement
- Tobacco industry playbook
- Tobacco politics
- Charney Report

=== Other books on the same theme ===
- Triumph of Doubt (2020) by David Michaels
- Climate Change Denial: Heads in the Sand (2011) by Haydn Washington and John Cook
- Climate Cover-Up: The Crusade to Deny Global Warming (2009) by James Hoggan and Richard Littlemore
- Doubt Is Their Product: How Industry's Assault on Science Threatens Your Health (2008) by David Michaels
