= Climate change denial =

Denial of the scientific consensus on climate change

On the floor of the U.S. Senate, Republican senator Jim Inhofe displayed a snowball—on 26 February 2015, in winter—as evidence the globe was not warming, in a year that was found to be Earth's warmest on record at the time. The director of NASA's Goddard Institute for Space Studies distinguished local weather in a single location in a single week from global climate change.

Climate change denial (also global warming denial) is a form of science denial characterized by rejecting, refusing to acknowledge, disputing, or fighting the extensive evidence for anthropogenic global warming that has led to a scientific consensus on climate change. Those promoting denial commonly use rhetorical tactics to give the appearance of a scientific controversy where none exists. Climate change denial includes raising unreasonable doubts about the extent to which climate change is caused by humans, its effects on nature and human society, and understating the costs of climate change adaptation while overstating the costs of mitigating it. To a lesser extent, climate change denial can also be implicit when people accept the science but fail to reconcile it with their belief or action. Several studies have analyzed these positions as forms of denialism, pseudoscience, or propaganda.

Many issues that are settled in the scientific community, such as human responsibility for climate change, remain the subject of politically or economically motivated attempts to downplay, dismiss or deny them—an ideological phenomenon academics and scientists call climate change denial. Climate scientists, especially in the United States, have reported government and oil-industry pressure to censor or suppress their work and hide scientific data, with directives not to discuss the subject publicly. The fossil fuels lobby has been identified as overtly or covertly supporting efforts to undermine or discredit the scientific consensus on climate change.

Industrial, political and ideological interests organize activity to undermine public trust in climate science. Climate change denial has been associated with the fossil fuels lobby, the Koch brothers, industry advocates, ultraconservative think tanks, and ultraconservative alternative media, often in the U.S. More than 90% of papers that are skeptical of climate change originate from right-wing think tanks. Climate change denial is undermining efforts to act on or adapt to climate change, and exerts a powerful influence on the politics of climate change.

In the 1970s, oil companies published research that broadly concurred with the scientific community's view on climate change. Since then, for several decades, oil companies have been organizing a widespread and systematic climate change denial campaign to seed public disinformation, a strategy that has been compared to the tobacco industry's organized denial of the hazards of tobacco smoking. Some of the campaigns are carried out by the same people who previously spread the tobacco industry's denialist propaganda.

== Terminology ==
Climate change denial refers to denial, dismissal, or doubt of the scientific consensus on the rate and extent of climate change, its significance, or its connection to human behavior, in whole or in part. Climate denial is a form of science denial. It can also take pseudoscientific forms. Deniers often use the term "climate skeptic" or "contrarian" instead, to sow confusion about their intentions.

The terminology is debated: most of those actively rejecting the scientific consensus use the terms skeptic and climate change skepticism, and only a few have expressed preference for being described as deniers. But the word "skepticism" is incorrectly used, as scientific skepticism is an intrinsic part of scientific methodology. In fact, all scientists adhere to scientific skepticism as part of the scientific process that demands continuing questioning. Both options are problematic, but climate change denial has become more widely used than skepticism.

The term contrarian is more specific but less frequently used. In academic literature and journalism, the terms climate change denial and climate change deniers have well-established usage as descriptive terms without any pejorative connotation.

The terminology evolved and emerged in the 1990s. By 1995 the word "skeptic" was being used specifically for the minority who publicized views contrary to the scientific consensus. This small group of scientists presented their views in public statements and the media rather than to the scientific community. Journalist Ross Gelbspan said in 1995 that industry had engaged "a small band of skeptics" to confuse public opinion in a "persistent and well-funded campaign of denial". His 1997 book The Heat is On may have been the first to concentrate specifically on the topic. In it, Gelbspan discusses a "pervasive denial of global warming" in a "persistent campaign of denial and suppression" involving "undisclosed funding of these 'greenhouse skeptics'" with "the climate skeptics" confusing the public and influencing decision makers.

In December 2014, an open letter from the Committee for Skeptical Inquiry called on the media to stop using the term skepticism when referring to climate change denial. It contrasted scientific skepticism—which is "foundational to the scientific method"—with denial—"the a priori rejection of ideas without objective consideration"—and the behavior of those involved in political attempts to undermine climate science. It said: "Not all individuals who call themselves climate change skeptics are deniers. But virtually all deniers have falsely branded themselves as skeptics. By perpetrating this misnomer, journalists have granted undeserved credibility to those who reject science and scientific inquiry."

In 2015, The New York Times's public editor said that the Times was increasingly using denier when "someone is challenging established science", but assessing this on an individual basis with no fixed policy, and would not use the term when someone was "kind of wishy-washy on the subject or in the middle". The executive director of the Society of Environmental Journalists said that while there was reasonable skepticism about specific issues, she felt that "denier" was "the most accurate term when someone claims there is no such thing as global warming, or agrees that it exists but denies that it has any cause we could understand or any impact that could be measured".

A petition by climatetruth.org asked signers to "Tell the Associated Press: Establish a rule in the AP Stylebook ruling out the use of 'skeptic' to describe those who deny scientific facts". In September 2015, the Associated Press announced "an addition to AP Stylebook entry on global warming" that advised "to describe those who don't accept climate science or dispute the world is warming from human-made forces, use 'climate change doubters' or 'those who reject mainstream climate science'. Avoid use of 'skeptics' or 'deniers'". In May 2019, The Guardian also rejected use of the term "climate skeptic" in favor of "climate science denier".

In addition to explicit denial, people have also shown implicit denial by accepting the scientific consensus but failing to "translate their acceptance into action". This type of denial is also called soft climate change denial.

== Categories and tactics ==
Characteristics of science denial (including climate science denial)

Climate misinformation falls within categories such as ● Global warming isn't happening. ● Humans aren't causing global warming. ● Climate impacts aren't bad. ● Climate solutions won't work. ● Climate science is unreliable.

In 2004, German climate scientist Stefan Rahmstorf described how the media give the misleading impression that climate change is still disputed within the scientific community, attributing this impression to climate change skeptics' PR efforts. He identified different positions that climate skeptics argue, which he used as a taxonomy of climate change skepticism. Later the model was also applied to denial:

1. Trend skeptics or deniers (who claim that no significant warming is taking place): "Given that the warming is now evident even to laypeople, the trend skeptics are a gradually vanishing breed. They [...] claim that the warming trend measured by weather stations is an artefact due to urbanisation around those stations (urban heat island effect)."
2. Attribution skeptics or deniers (who accept the climate change trends but claim there are natural causes for this, not human-made ones): "A few of them even deny that the rise in the atmospheric carbon dioxide content is anthropogenic; they claim that the atmospheric carbon dioxide is released from the ocean by natural processes."
3. Impact skeptics or deniers (who think climate change is harmless or even beneficial, for example the "potential extension of agriculture into higher latitudes").
4. Sometimes consensus denial is added, for people who question the existence of the scientific consensus on anthropogenic climate change.

The National Center for Science Education describes climate change denial as disputing differing points in the scientific consensus, a sequential range of arguments from denying the occurrence of climate change, accepting that but denying any significant human contribution, accepting these but denying scientific findings on how this would affect nature and human society, to accepting all these but denying that humans can mitigate or reduce the problems. James L. Powell provides a more extended list, as does climatologist Michael E. Mann in "six stages of denial", a ladder model whereby deniers have over time conceded acceptance of points, while retreating to a position that still rejects the mainstream consensus:

1. CO_{2} is not actually increasing.
2. Even if it is, the increase has no impact on the climate since there is no convincing evidence of warming.
3. Even if there is warming, it is due to natural causes.
4. Even if the warming cannot be explained by natural causes, the human impact is small, and the impact of continued greenhouse gas emissions will be minor.
5. Even if the current and future projected human effects on Earth's climate are not negligible, the changes are generally going to be good for us.
6. Whether or not the changes are going to be good for us, humans are very adept at adapting to changes; besides, it's too late to do anything about it, and/or a technological fix is bound to come along when we really need it.

One deceptive approach is cherry picking data from short time periods to assert that global average temperatures are not rising. Blue trendlines show short-term countertrends that mask longer-term warming trends that are shown by red trendlines. Such representations have been applied to the so-called global warming hiatus (blue rectangle with blue dots, upper right).

Climate change denial is a form of denialism. Chris and Mark Hoofnagle have defined denialism in this context as the use of rhetorical devices "to give the appearance of legitimate debate where there is none, an approach that has the ultimate goal of rejecting a proposition on which a scientific consensus exists." This process characteristically uses one or more of the following tactics:

1. Allegations that scientific consensus involves conspiring to fake data or suppress the truth: a climate change conspiracy theory.
2. Fake experts, or individuals with views at odds with established knowledge, at the same time marginalizing or denigrating published topic experts. Like the manufactured doubt over smoking and health, a few contrarian scientists oppose the climate consensus, some of them the same people.
3. Selectivity, such as cherry-picking atypical or even obsolete papers, in the same way that the MMR vaccine controversy was based on one paper: examples include discredited ideas of the medieval warm period.
4. Unworkable demands of research, claiming that any uncertainty invalidates the field or exaggerating uncertainty while rejecting probabilities and mathematical models.
5. Logical fallacies.

=== Discussing specific aspects of climate change science ===
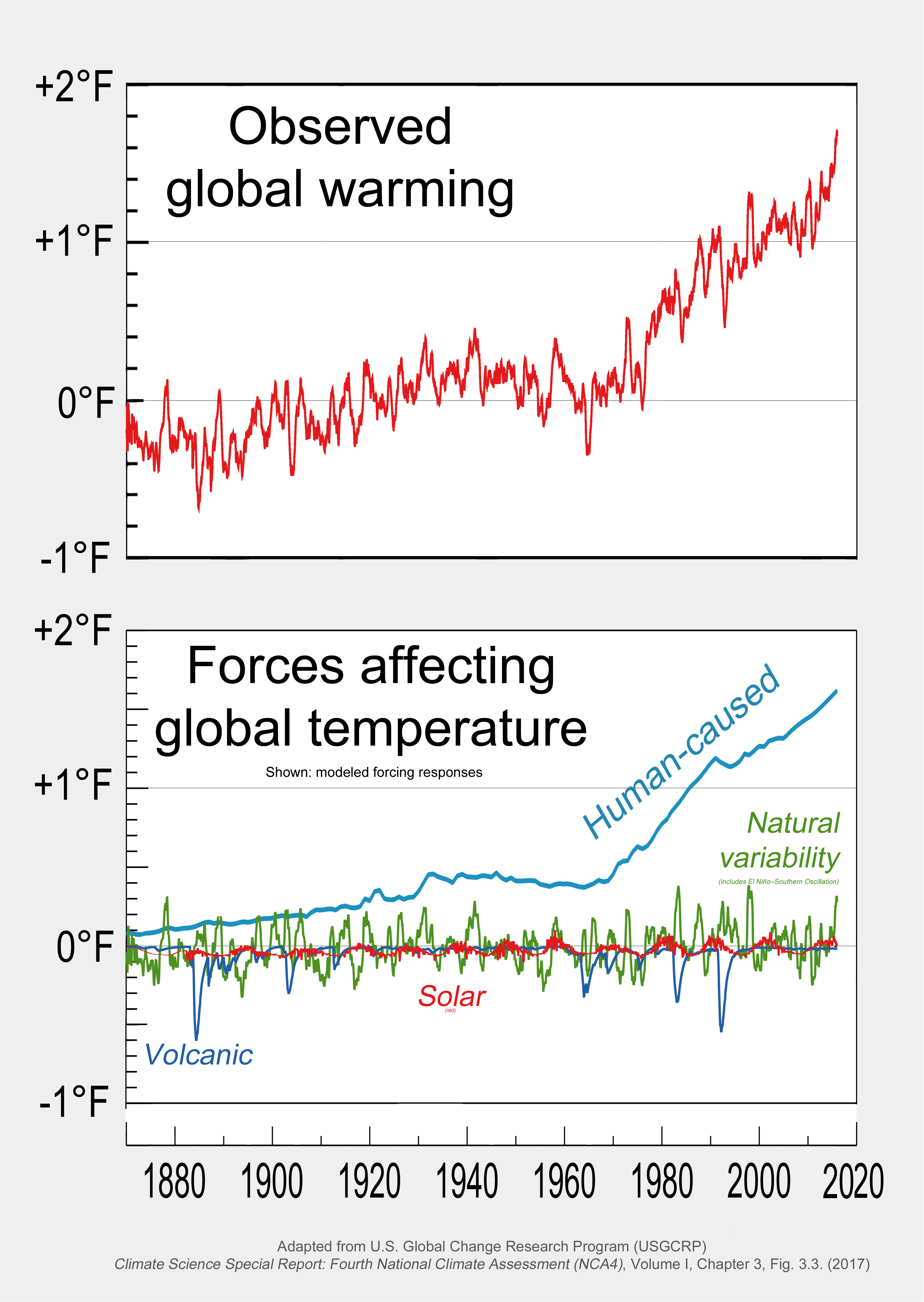
The Fourth National Climate Assessment ("NCA4", U.S., 2017) includes charts illustrating how human factors—not various natural factors that have been investigated—are the predominant cause of observed global warming.

Campaigns by climate change deniers portray scientists as disagreeing about global warming, but datasets from various scientific organizations show 1880– pairwise correlations of the four longer-term datasets are at least 99.29%.

Climate change denial opposes the results of academic studies of scientific agreement on human-caused climate change. The level of scientific consensus positively correlates with expertise in climate science.

Some politicians and climate change denial groups say that because CO_{2} is only a trace gas in the atmosphere (0.04%), it cannot cause climate change. But scientists have known for over a century that even this small proportion has a significant warming effect, and doubling the proportion leads to a large temperature increase. Some groups allege that water vapor is a more significant greenhouse gas, and is left out of many climate models. But while water vapor is a greenhouse gas, its very short atmospheric lifetime (about 10 days) compared to that of CO_{2} (hundreds of years) means that CO_{2} is the primary driver of increasing temperatures; water vapor acts as a feedback, not a forcing mechanism.

Climate denial groups may also argue that global warming has stopped, that a global warming hiatus is in effect, or that global temperatures are actually decreasing, leading to global cooling. These arguments are based on short-term fluctuations and ignore the long-term pattern.

Some groups and prominent deniers such as William Happer argue that there is a greenhouse gas saturation effect that significantly decreases the warming potential of further gases released into the atmosphere. Such an effect does exist in some form, as Happer's research demonstrates, but is likely negligible with respect to net global warming.

Climate change denial literature often features the suggestion that we should wait for better technologies before addressing climate change, when they will be more affordable and effective. The belief that technological innovation rather than widespread social change will offer solutions is sometime called techno-optimism.

==== Playing up the potential non-human causes ====
Climate denial groups and authors often point to natural variability, such as sunspots and cosmic rays, to explain the warming trend. According to them, natural variability occurs over time, and human activity has little effect. But climate models already take these factors into account. The scientific consensus is that they do not explain the observed warming trend.

==== Playing up flawed studies ====
In 2007, the Heartland Institute published an article titled "500 Scientists Whose Research Contradicts Man-Made Global Warming Scares" by Dennis T. Avery, a food policy analyst at the Hudson Institute. Avery's list was immediately called into question for misunderstanding and distorting the conclusions of many of the named studies and citing outdated, flawed studies that had long been abandoned. Many of the scientists on the list demanded their names be removed. At least 45 of them had no idea they were included as "co-authors" and disagreed with the article's conclusions. The Heartland Institute refused these requests, saying that the scientists "have no right—legally or ethically—to demand that their names be removed from a bibliography composed by researchers with whom they disagree".

==== Disputing IPCC reports and processes ====
Deniers have generally attacked either the IPCC's processes, scientist or the synthesis and executive summaries; the full reports attract less attention.

In 1996, climate change denier Frederick Seitz criticized the 1995 IPCC Second Assessment Report, alleging corruption in the peer-review process. Scientists rejected his assertions; the presidents of the American Meteorological Society and University Corporation for Atmospheric Research described his claims as part of a "systematic effort by some individuals to undermine and discredit the scientific process".

In 2005, the House of Lords Economics Committee wrote, "We have some concerns about the objectivity of the IPCC process, with some of its emissions scenarios and summary documentation apparently influenced by political considerations." It doubted the high emission scenarios and said that the IPCC had "played-down" what the committee called "some positive aspects of global warming". The main statements of the House of Lords Economics Committee were rejected in the response made by the United Kingdom government.

On 10 December 2008, the U.S. Senate Committee on Environment and Public Works minority members released a report under the leadership of the Senate's most vocal global warming denier, Jim Inhofe. It says it summarizes scientific dissent from the IPCC. Many of its statements about the numbers of people listed in the report, whether they are actually scientists, and whether they support the positions attributed to them, have been disputed. Inhofe also said that "some parts of the IPCC process resembled a Soviet-style trial, in which the facts are predetermined, and ideological purity trumps technical and scientific rigor."

==== Creating doubts about scientific publishing processes ====
Some climate change deniers promote conspiracy theories alleging that the scientific consensus is illusory, or that climatologists are acting out of their own financial interests by causing undue alarm about a changing climate. Some climate change deniers claim that there is no scientific consensus on climate change, that any evidence for a scientific consensus is faked, or that the peer-review process for climate science papers has become corrupted by scientists seeking to suppress dissent. No evidence of such conspiracies has been presented. In fact, much of the data used in climate science is publicly available, contradicting allegations that scientists are hiding data or stonewalling requests.

Some climate change deniers assert that the scientific consensus on climate change is based on conspiracies to produce manipulated data or suppress dissent. It is one of a number of tactics used in climate change denial to attempt to manufacture political and public controversy disputing this consensus. These people typically allege that, through worldwide acts of professional and criminal misconduct, the science behind climate change has been invented or distorted for ideological or financial reasons.

The Great Global Warming Swindle is a 2007 British polemical documentary film directed by Martin Durkin that denies the scientific consensus about the reality and causes of climate change, justifying this by suggesting that climatology is influenced by funding and political factors. The film strongly opposes the scientific consensus on climate change. It argues that the consensus on climate change is the product of "a multibillion-dollar worldwide industry: created by fanatically anti-industrial environmentalists; supported by scientists peddling scare stories to chase funding; and propped up by complicit politicians and the media". The programme's publicity materials claim that man-made global warming is "a lie" and "the biggest scam of modern times." The film received strong criticism from many scientists and others. Journalist George Monbiot called it "the same old conspiracy theory that we've been hearing from the denial industry for the past ten years".

The climate deniers involved in the Climatic Research Unit email controversy ("Climategate") in 2009 claimed that researchers faked the data in their research publications and suppressed their critics in order to receive more funding (i.e. taxpayer money). Eight committees investigated these allegations and published reports, each finding no evidence of fraud or scientific misconduct. According to the Muir Russell report, the scientists' "rigor and honesty as scientists are not in doubt", the investigators "did not find any evidence of behavior that might undermine the conclusions of the IPCC assessments", but there had been "a consistent pattern of failing to display the proper degree of openness." The scientific consensus that climate change is occurring as a result of human activity remained unchanged at the end of the investigations.

=== Being "lukewarm" or "skeptical" ===
In 2012, Clive Hamilton published the essay "Climate change and the soothing message of luke-warmism". He defined luke-warmists as "those who appear to accept the body of climate science but interpret it in a way that is least threatening: emphasising uncertainties, playing down dangers, and advocating a slow and cautious response. They are politically conservative and anxious about the threat to the social structure posed by the implications of climate science. Their 'pragmatic' approach is therefore alluring to political leaders looking for a justification for policy minimalism." He cited Ted Nordhaus and Michael Shellenberger of the Breakthrough Institute, and also Roger A. Pielke Jr., Daniel Sarewitz, Steve Rayner, Mike Hulme and "the pre-eminent luke-warmist" Danish economist Bjørn Lomborg.

Climate change skepticism, while in some cases professing to do research on climate change, has focused instead on influencing the opinion of the public, legislators and the media, in contrast to legitimate science.

Pope Francis groups together four types of respondents rejecting climate change: those who "deny, conceal, gloss over or relativize the issue".

=== Pushing for adaptation only ===
The conservative National Center for Policy Analysis, whose "Environmental Task Force" contains a number of climate change deniers, including Sherwood Idso and Fred Singer, has said, "The growing consensus on climate change policies is that adaptation will protect present and future generations from climate-sensitive risks far more than efforts to restrict CO_{2} emissions."

The adaptation-only plan is also endorsed by oil companies like ExxonMobil. According to a Ceres report, "ExxonMobil's plan appears to be to stay the course and try to adjust when changes occur. The company's plan is one that involves adaptation, as opposed to leadership."

The George W. Bush administration also voiced support for an adaptation-only policy in 2002. "In a stark shift for the Bush administration, the United States has sent a climate report [U.S. Climate Action Report 2002] to the United Nations detailing specific and far-reaching effects it says global warming will inflict on the American environment. In the report, the administration also for the first time places most of the blame for recent global warming on human actions—mainly the burning of fossil fuels that send heat-trapping greenhouse gases into the atmosphere." The report "does not propose any major shift in the administration's policy on greenhouse gases. Instead it recommends adapting to inevitable changes instead of making rapid and drastic reductions in greenhouse gases to limit warming." This position apparently precipitated a similar shift in emphasis at the COP 8 climate talks in New Delhi several months later; "The shift satisfies the Bush administration, which has fought to avoid mandatory cuts in emissions for fear it would harm the economy. 'We're welcoming a focus on more of a balance on adaptation versus mitigation', said a senior American negotiator in New Delhi. 'You don't have enough money to do everything.'"

Some find this shift and attitude disingenuous and indicative of a bias against prevention (i.e. reducing emissions/consumption) and toward prolonging the oil industry's profits at the environment's expense. In an article addressing the supposed economic hazards of addressing climate change, writer and environmental activist George Monbiot wrote: "Now that the dismissal of climate change is no longer fashionable, the professional deniers are trying another means of stopping us from taking action. It would be cheaper, they say, to wait for the impacts of climate change and then adapt to them".

=== Delaying climate change mitigation measures ===
A 2022 study found that the public in many countries substantially underestimates the degree of scientific consensus that humans are causing climate change. Studies from 2019–2021 found scientific consensus to range from 98.7–100%.

Research found that 80–90% of Americans underestimate the prevalence of support for major climate change mitigation policies and climate concern. While 66–80% Americans support these policies, Americans estimate the prevalence to be 37–43%. Researchers have called this misperception a false social reality, a form of pluralistic ignorance.

Climate change deniers often debate whether action (such as the restrictions on the use of fossil fuels to reduce carbon-dioxide emissions) should be taken now or in the near future. They fear the economic ramifications of such restrictions. For example, in a 1998 speech, a staff member of the Cato Institute, a libertarian think tank, argued that emission controls' negative economic effects outweighed their environmental benefits. Climate change deniers tend to argue that even if global warming is caused solely by the burning of fossil fuels, restricting their use would damage the world economy more than the increases in global temperature.

Conversely, the general consensus is that early action to reduce emissions would help avoid much greater economic costs later, and reduce the risk of catastrophic, irreversible change.

Earlier, climate change deniers' online YouTube content focused on denying global warming, or saying such warming is not caused by humans burning fossil fuel. As such denials became untenable, content shifted to asserting that climate solutions are unworkable, that global warming is harmless or even beneficial, and that the environmental movement is unreliable.

A 2016 article in Science made the case that opposition to climate policy was beginning to take a "rhetorical shift away from outright skepticism" and called this neoskepticism. Rather than denying the existence of global warming, neoskeptics instead "question the magnitude of the risks and assert that reducing them has more costs than benefits." According to the authors, the emergence of neoskepticism "heightens the need for science to inform decision making under uncertainty and to improve communication and education."

There is a range of possible mitigation policies. Disagreement over the sufficiency, viability, or desirability of a given policy is not necessarily neoskepticism. But neoskepticism is marked by failure to appreciate the increased risks associated with delayed action. Gavin Schmidt has called neoskepticism a form of confirmation bias and the tendency to always take "as gospel the lowest estimate of a plausible range". Neoskeptics err on the side of the least disruptive projections and least active policies and, as such, neglect or misapprehend the full spectrum of risks associated with global warming.

In political terms, soft climate denial can stem from concerns about the economics and economic impacts of climate change, particularly the concern that strong measures to combat global warming or mitigate its impacts will seriously inhibit economic growth.

=== Promoting conspiracy theories ===
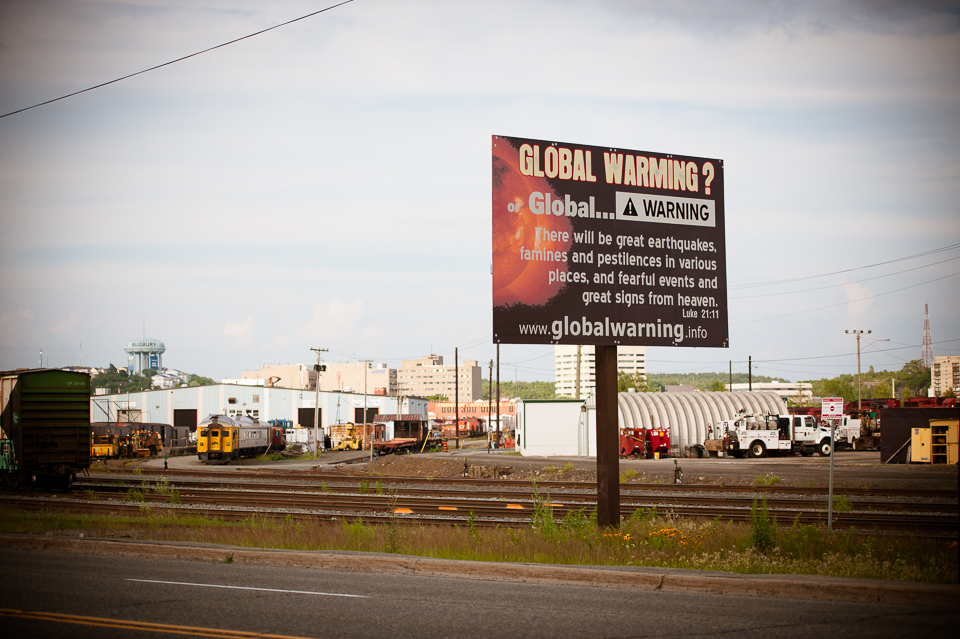
Climate change denial sign in Sudbury, Canada (2016)

Climate change denial is commonly rooted in a phenomenon known as conspiracy theory, in which people misattribute events to a powerful group's secret plot or plan. People with certain cognitive tendencies are also more drawn than others to conspiracy theories about climate change. Conspiratorial beliefs are more predominantly found in narcissistic people and those who consistently look for meanings or patterns in their world, including believers in paranormal activity. Climate change conspiracy disbelief is also linked to lower levels of education and analytic thinking.

Scientists are investigating which factors associated with conspiracy belief can be influenced and changed. They have identified "uncertainty, feelings of powerlessness, political cynicism, magical thinking, and errors in logical and probabilistic reasoning".

In 2012, researchers found that belief in other conspiracy theories was associated with being more likely to endorse climate change denial. Examples of science-related conspiracy theories that some people believe include that aliens exist, childhood vaccines are linked to autism, Bigfoot is real, the government "adds fluoride to drinking water for 'sinister' purposes", and the moon landing was faked.

Examples of alleged climate change conspiracies include:

- Aiming at New World Order: Senator James Inhofe, a Republican from Oklahoma, suggested in 2006 that supporters of the Kyoto Protocol such as Jacques Chirac are aiming at global governance. In his speech, Inhofe said: "So, I wonder: are the French going to be dictating U.S. policy?" William M. Gray also claimed in 2006 that scientists support the scientific consensus on climate change because they were promoted by government leaders and environmentalists seeking world government. He added that its purpose was to exercise political influence, to try to introduce world government, and to control people.
- To promote other types of energy sources: Some have claimed that the "threat of global warming is an attempt to promote nuclear power". Another claim is that "because many people have invested in renewable energy companies, they stand to lose a lot of money if global warming is shown to be a myth. According to this theory, environmental groups therefore bribe climate scientists to doctor their data so that they are able to secure their financial investment in green energy."

== Psychology ==
The psychology of climate change denial is the study of why people deny climate change, despite the scientific consensus on climate change. A study assessed public perception and action on climate change on grounds of belief systems, and identified seven psychological barriers affecting behavior that otherwise would facilitate mitigation, adaptation, and environmental stewardship: cognition, ideological worldviews, comparisons to key people, costs and momentum, disbelief in experts and authorities, perceived risks of change, and inadequate behavioral changes. Other factors include distance in time, space, and influence.

Reactions to climate change may include anxiety, depression, despair, dissonance, uncertainty, insecurity, and distress, with one psychologist suggesting that "despair about our changing climate may get in the way of fixing it." The American Psychological Association has urged psychologists and other social scientists to work on psychological barriers to taking action on climate change. The immediacy of a growing number of extreme weather events are thought to motivate people to deal with climate change.

A study published in PLOS One in 2024 found that even a single repetition of a claim was sufficient to increase the perceived truth of both climate science-aligned claims and climate change skeptic/denial claims—"highlighting the insidious effect of repetition". This effect was found even among climate science endorsers.

== Connections to other debates ==
=== Links with other environmental issues ===
Many of the climate change deniers have disagreed, in whole or part, with the scientific consensus regarding other issues, particularly those relating to environmental risks, such as ozone depletion, DDT, and passive smoking.

In the 1990s, the Marshall Institute began campaigning against increased regulations on environmental issues such as acid rain, ozone depletion, second-hand smoke, and the dangers of DDT. In each case their argument was that the science was too uncertain to justify any government intervention, a strategy it borrowed from earlier efforts to downplay the health effects of tobacco in the 1980s. This campaign would continue for the next two decades.

=== Links with nationalism and right-wing groups ===
In 2023, an increase in climate change denial was noted, particularly among supporters of the far right.

It has been suggested that climate change can conflict with a nationalistic view because it is "unsolvable" at the national level and requires collective action between nations or between local communities, and that therefore populist nationalism tends to reject the science of climate change.

The UK Independence Party's policy on climate change has been influenced by climate change denier Christopher Monckton and by its energy spokesman Roger Helmer, who has said, "It is not clear that the rise in atmospheric carbon dioxide is anthropogenic."

Jerry Taylor of the Niskanen Center posits that climate change denial is an important component of Trumpian historical consciousness, and "plays a significant role in the architecture of Trumpism as a developing philosophical system".

Though climate change denial was apparently waning circa 2021, some right-wing nationalist organizations have adopted a theory of "environmental populism" advocating that natural resources be preserved for a nation's existing residents, to the exclusion of immigrants. Other such right-wing organizations have contrived new "green wings" that falsely assert that refugees from poor nations cause environmental pollution and climate change and should therefore be excluded.

A study published in PLOS Climate studied two forms of national identity—defensive or "national narcissism" and "secure national identification"—for their correlation to support for policies to mitigate climate change and transition to renewable energy. The authors defined national narcissism as "a belief that one's national group is exceptional and deserves external recognition underlain by unsatisfied psychological needs". They defined secure national identification as "reflect[ing] feelings of strong bonds and solidarity with one's ingroup members, and sense of satisfaction in group membership". The researchers concluded that secure national identification tends to support policies promoting renewable energy, while national narcissism is inversely correlated with support for such policies—except to the extent that such policies, as well as greenwashing, enhance the national image. Right-wing political orientation, which may indicate susceptibility to climate conspiracy beliefs, was also found to be negatively correlated with support for genuine climate mitigation policies.

=== Conservative views ===
Degrees of concern about the effects of climate change can vary with political affiliation. This is very evident in the US, were voters of the Democratic Party worry much more about climate change than voters of the Republican Party. The gap has been widening since the late 2010s.

One worldview that often leads to climate change denial is belief in free enterprise capitalism. The "freedom of the commons" (tragedy of the commons), or the freedom to use natural resources as a public good as it is practiced in free enterprise capitalism, destroys important ecosystems and their functions, and so having a stake in this worldview does not correlate with climate change mitigation behavior. Political worldview plays an important role in environmental policy and action. Liberals tend to focus on environmental risks, while conservatives focus on the benefits of economic development. Because of this difference, conflicting opinions on the acceptance of climate change arise.

A study of climate change denial indicators in public opinion data from ten Gallup surveys from 2001 to 2010 shows that conservative white men in the U.S. are significantly more likely to deny climate change than other Americans. Conservative white men who report understanding climate change very well are even more likely to deny climate change.

Another reason for the discrepancy in climate change denial between liberals and conservatives is that "contemporary environmental discourse is based largely on moral concerns related to harm and care, which are more deeply held by liberals than by conservatives"; if the discourse is instead framed using moral concerns related to purity that are more deeply held by conservatives, the discrepancy is resolved.

In the U.S., climate change denial largely correlates with political affiliation. This is partially because Democrats focus more on tighter government regulations and taxation, which are the basis for most environmental policy. Political affiliation also affects how different people interpret the same facts. More highly educated people are less likely to rely on their own interpretation and political ideology rather than on scientists' opinions. Therefore, political worldviews override expert opinion on the interpretation of climate facts and evidence of anthropogenic climate change.

Affiliation with a political group, especially in the U.S., is an important personal and social identity for many. Because of this, many people hold the popular values of their political affiliation, regardless of their personal beliefs, so as not to be ostracized by the group.

== History ==
Anthropogenic global warming—not global cooling or "imminent ice ages"—dominated peer-reviewed literature in the 1970s, contrary to false claims that climate science subsequently reversed its consensus.

Early Warnings

Throughout the 1950s and 1960s, top scientists concluded that global climate change was likely to occur, that burning fossil fuels was the primary cause, and that these climatic changes risked causing severe harms.

— Center for International Environmental Law
15 July 2026
Typical storyline of deniers

Since the late 1980s, this well-coordinated, well-funded campaign by contrarian scientists, free-market think tanks and industry has created a paralyzing fog of doubt around climate change. Through advertisements, op-eds, lobbying and media attention, greenhouse doubters (they hate being called deniers) argued first that the world is not warming; measurements indicating otherwise are flawed, they said. Then they claimed that any warming is natural, not caused by human activities. Now they contend that the looming warming will be minuscule and harmless.

— Sharon Begley, Newsweek, 2007

U.S. fossil fuel companies have known about global warming since at least the 1960s. In 1966, a coal industry research organization, Bituminous Coal Research Inc., published its finding that if then prevailing trends of coal consumption continued, "the temperature of the earth's atmosphere will increase" and "vast changes in the climates of the earth will result. [...] Such changes in temperature will cause melting of the polar icecaps, which, in turn, would result in the inundation of many coastal cities, including New York and London." In a discussion following this paper in the same publication, a combustion engineer for Peabody Coal, now Peabody Energy, the world's largest coal supplier, added that the coal industry was merely "buying time" before additional government air pollution regulations would be promulgated to clean the air. Nevertheless, the coal industry publicly advocated for decades thereafter the position that increased carbon dioxide in the atmosphere is beneficial for the planet.

Contrary to certain popular literature articles published in the 1970s, there was no scientific consensus of an imminent ice age: the possibility of anthropogenic warming dominated the peer-reviewed literature at the time. In response to increasing public awareness of the greenhouse effect in the 1970s, conservative reaction built up, denying environmental concerns that could lead to government regulation. In 1977, the first Secretary of Energy, James Schlesinger, suggested President Jimmy Carter take no action regarding a climate change memo, citing uncertainty. During the presidency of Ronald Reagan, global warming became a political issue, with immediate plans to cut spending on environmental research, particularly climate-related, and stop funding for CO_{2} monitoring. Congressman Al Gore was aware of the developing science: he joined others in arranging congressional hearings from 1981 onward, with testimony from scientists including Revelle, Stephen Schneider, and Wallace Smith Broecker.

An Environmental Protection Agency (EPA) report in 1983 said global warming was "not a theoretical problem but a threat whose effects will be felt within a few years", with potentially "catastrophic" consequences. The Reagan administration called the report "alarmist" and the dispute was widely covered. Public attention turned to other issues, then the 1985 finding of a polar ozone hole brought a swift international response. To the public, this was related to climate change and the possibility of effective action, but news interest faded.

Public attention was renewed amid summer droughts and heat waves when James Hansen testified to a Congressional hearing on 23 June 1988, saying with high confidence that long-term warming was underway with severe warming likely within the next 50 years, and warning of likely storms and floods. There was increasing media attention: the scientific community had reached a broad consensus that the climate was warming, human activity was very likely the primary cause, and there would be significant consequences if the trend was not curbed. These facts encouraged discussion about new environmental regulations, which the fossil fuel industry opposed.

From 1989 onward, industry-funded organizations, including the Global Climate Coalition and the George C. Marshall Institute, sought to spread doubt, in a strategy already developed by the tobacco industry. A small group of scientists opposed to the consensus on global warming became politically involved, and with support from conservative political interests, began publishing in books and the press rather than in scientific journals. Historian Spencer Weart identifies this period as the point where skepticism about basic aspects of climate science was no longer justified, and those spreading mistrust about these issues became deniers. As the scientific community and new data increasingly refuted their arguments, deniers turned to political arguments, making personal attacks on scientists' reputations, and promoting ideas of global warming conspiracies.

With the 1989 fall of communism, the attention of U.S. conservative think tanks, which had been organized in the 1970s as an intellectual counter-movement to socialism, turned from the "red scare" to the "green scare" tactic, which they saw as a threat to their aims of private property, free trade market economies, and global capitalism. They used environmental skepticism to promote denial of environmental problems such as loss of biodiversity and climate change.

The campaign to spread doubt continued into the 1990s, including an advertising campaign funded by coal industry advocates intended to "reposition global warming as theory rather than fact". There was also a 1998 proposal by the American Petroleum Institute to recruit scientists to convince politicians, the media, and the public that climate science was too uncertain to warrant environmental regulation.

In 1998, journalists Ross Gelbspan noted that his fellow journalists accepted that global warming was occurring, but were in "'stage-two' denial of the climate crisis", unable to accept the feasibility of solutions to the problem. His book, Boiling Point, published in 2004, detailed the fossil-fuel industry's campaign to deny climate change and undermine public confidence in climate science.

In Newsweek's August 2007 cover story "The Truth About Denial", Sharon Begley reported that "the denial machine is running at full throttle", and that this "well-coordinated, well-funded campaign" by contrarian scientists, free-market think tanks, and industry had "created a paralyzing fog of doubt around climate change."

=== Similarities with tobacco industry tactics ===
In 2006, George Monbiot published an article about similarities between the methods of groups funded by Exxon and those of the tobacco giant Philip Morris, including direct attacks on peer-reviewed science and attempts to create public controversy and doubt.

The approach to downplay climate change's significance was copied from tobacco lobbyists, who attempted to prevent or delay the introduction of regulation in the face of scientific evidence linking tobacco to lung cancer. They attempted to discredit the research by creating doubt, manipulating debate, discrediting the scientists involved, disputing their findings, and creating and maintaining an apparent controversy by promoting claims that contradicted scientific research. Doubt shielded the tobacco industry from litigation and regulation for decades.

For example, in 1992 an EPA report linked secondhand smoke with lung cancer. In response, the tobacco industry engaged the APCO Worldwide public relations company, which set out a strategy of astroturfing campaigns to cast doubt on the science by linking smoking anxieties with other issues, including global warming, in order to turn public opinion against calls for government intervention. The campaign depicted public concerns as "unfounded fears" supposedly based only on "junk science" in contrast to their "sound science", and operated through front groups, primarily the Advancement of Sound Science Center (TASSC) and its Junk Science website, run by Steven Milloy. A tobacco company memo read, "Doubt is our product since it is the best means of competing with the 'body of fact' that exists in the mind of the general public. It is also the means of establishing a controversy."

During the 1990s, the tobacco campaign died away, and TASSC began taking funding from oil companies, including Exxon. Its website became central in distributing "almost every kind of climate-change denial that has found its way into the popular press." Monbiot wrote that TASSC "has done more damage to the campaign to halt [climate change] than any other body" by trying to manufacture the appearance of a grassroots movement against "unfounded fear" and "over-regulation".

=== Republican Party in the United States ===
Voters of the Democratic Party in the U.S. are more likely to (correctly) agree that global warming is due to human activity than voters of the Republican Party. This gap widened in the late 2010s.

During the 2020 California wildfires

It'll start getting cooler, you just watch. [...] I don't think science knows, actually.

— Then U.S. President Donald Trump,
September 13, 2020.

The Republican Party in the United States is unique in denying anthropogenic climate change among conservative political parties in the Western world. In 1994, according to a leaked memo, the Republican strategist Frank Luntz advised members of the Republican Party, with regard to climate change, that "you need to continue to make the lack of scientific certainty a primary issue" and "challenge the science" by "recruiting experts who are sympathetic to your view". (In 2006, Luntz said he still believes "back [in] '97, '98, the science was uncertain", but now agreed with the scientific consensus.) From 2008 to 2017, the Republican Party went from "debating how to combat human-caused climate change to arguing that it does not exist". In 2011, "more than half of the Republicans in the House and three-quarters of Republican senators" said "that the threat of global warming, as a human-made and highly threatening phenomenon, is at best an exaggeration and at worst an utter 'hoax'".

In 2014, more than 55% of congressional Republicans were reported to be climate change deniers. According to PolitiFact in May 2014, Jerry Brown's statement that "virtually no Republican" in Washington accepts climate change science was "mostly true"; PolitiFact counted "eight out of 278, or about 3 percent" of Republican members of Congress who "accept the prevailing scientific conclusion that global warming is both real and man-made."

In 2005, The New York Times reported that Philip Cooney, a former fossil fuel lobbyist and "climate team leader" at the American Petroleum Institute and President George W. Bush's chief of staff of the Council on Environmental Quality, had "repeatedly edited government climate reports in ways that play down links between such emissions and global warming, according to internal documents". Sharon Begley reported in Newsweek that Cooney "edited a 2002 report on climate science by sprinkling it with phrases such as 'lack of understanding' and 'considerable uncertainty'." Cooney reportedly removed an entire section on climate in one report, whereupon another lobbyist sent him a fax saying "You are doing a great job."

The sharp divide over the existence of and responsibility for global warming and climate change falls largely along party lines in the US (Democrats and Republicans). Overall, 60% of Americans surveyed in 2021 said oil and gas companies were "completely or mostly responsible" for climate change.

In the 2016 U.S. election cycle, every Republican presidential candidate, and the Republican leader in the U.S. Senate, questioned or denied climate change, and opposed U.S. government steps to address it.

In 2016, Aaron McCright argued that anti-environmentalism—and climate change denial specifically—had expanded in the U.S. to become "a central tenet of the current conservative and Republican identity".

In a 2017 interview, United States Secretary of Energy Rick Perry acknowledged the existence of climate change and impact from humans, but said that he did not agree that carbon dioxide was its primary driver, pointing instead to "the ocean waters and this environment that we live in". The American Meteorological Society responded in a letter to Perry that it is "critically important that you understand that emissions of carbon dioxide and other greenhouse gases are the primary cause", pointing to conclusions of scientists worldwide.

Climate denial has started to decrease among the Republican Party leadership toward acknowledgment that "the climate is changing"; a 2019 study by several major think tanks called the climate right "fragmented and underfunded".

Florida Republican Tom Lee described people's emotional impact and reactions to climate change, saying: "I mean, you have to be the Grim Reaper of reality in a world that isn't real fond of the Grim Reaper. That's why I use the term 'emotionally shut down', because I think I think you lose people at hello a lot times in the Republican conversation over this."

When a moderator at the August 23, 2023, Republican presidential debate asked the candidates to raise their hands if they believed human behavior is causing climate change, none did. Entrepreneur Vivek Ramaswamy said, "the climate change agenda is a hoax" and that "more people are dying of climate change policies than they actually are of climate change"; none of his competitors challenged him directly on climate. After investigating Ramaswamy's latter claim, fact-checking websites found no supporting evidence.

== Denial networks ==
The archetypes of climate change deniers

The Paid Lobbyist (the coal industry, among others, is fighting emission reductions), the Don Quixote (emotionally committed laypeople, frequently pensioners, but also including a few journalists – many of them literally fighting windmills), and the Eccentric Scientist (they are few and far between). All three groups act like lobbyists: from a thousand research results, they cherry-pick and present the three that happen to support their own position – albeit only with a liberal interpretation."

— Stefan Rahmstorf, 2004

=== Conservative and libertarian think tanks ===
A 2000 article explored the connection between conservative think tanks and climate change denial. Research found that specific groups were marshaling skepticism against climate change; a 2008 University of Central Florida study found that 92% of "environmentally skeptical" literature published in the U.S. was partly or wholly affiliated with self-proclaimed conservative think tanks.

In 2013, the Center for Media and Democracy reported that the State Policy Network (SPN), an umbrella group of 64 U.S. think tanks, had been lobbying on behalf of major corporations and conservative donors to oppose climate change regulation.

Conservative and libertarian think tanks in the U.S., such as The Heritage Foundation, Marshall Institute, Cato Institute, and the American Enterprise Institute, were significant participants in lobbying attempts seeking to halt or eliminate environmental regulations.

Between 2002 and 2010, the combined annual income of 91 climate change counter-movement organizations—think tanks, advocacy groups and industry associations—was roughly $900 million. During the same period, billionaires secretively donated nearly $120 million (£77 million) via the Donors Trust and Donors Capital Fund to more than 100 organizations seeking to undermine the public perception of the science on climate change.

=== Publishers, websites and networks ===
In November 2021, a study by the Center for Countering Digital Hate identified "ten fringe publishers" that together were responsible for nearly 70 percent of Facebook user interactions with content that denied climate change. Facebook said the percentage was overstated and called the study misleading. The "toxic ten" were Breitbart News, The Western Journal, Newsmax, Townhall, Media Research Center, The Washington Times, The Federalist, The Daily Wire, RT (TV network), and The Patriot Post.

The Rebel Media and its director, Ezra Levant, have promoted climate change denial and oil sands extraction in Alberta.

Willard Anthony Watts is an American blogger who runs Watts Up With That?, a climate change denial blog.

A piece of research from 2015 identified 4,556 people with overlapping network ties to 164 organizations that were responsible for most efforts to downplay the threat of climate change in the U.S.

==== Publications for school children ====
According to documents leaked in February 2012, The Heartland Institute is developing a curriculum for use in US schools that frames climate change as a scientific controversy. In 2017, deputy director of the National Center for Science Education (NCSE) Glenn Branch wrote, "the Heartland Institute is continuing to inflict its climate change denial literature on science teachers across the country". Each significant claim was rated for accuracy by scientists who were experts on that topic. It was found that "the 'Key Findings' section are incorrect, misleading, based on flawed logic, or simply factually inaccurate". The NCSE has prepared Classroom Resources in response to Heartland and other anti-science threats.

In 2023, Republican politician and Baptist minister Mike Huckabee published Kids Guide to the Truth About Climate Change, which acknowledges global warming but minimizes the influence of human emissions. Marketed as an alternative to mainstream education, the publication does not attribute authorship or cite scientific credentials. The NCSE's deputy director called the publication "propaganda" and "very unreliable as a guide to climate change for kids", saying it represented "present-day" atmospheric concentrations of carbon dioxide as 280 parts per million (ppm), which was true in 391 BC but short of 2023's actual concentration of 420 ppm.

In 2023, the state of Florida approved a public school curriculum including videos produced by conservative advocacy group PragerU that liken climate change skeptics to those who fought Communism and Nazism, imply renewable energy harms the environment, and say current global warming occurs naturally.

Texas, which has a large influence on school textbooks published nationwide, proposed textbooks in 2023 that included more information about the climate crisis than editions a decade earlier. But some books clouded the human causes of climate change and downplayed the role of fossil fuels, with Texas U.S. Representative August Pfluger emphasizing the importance of "secure, reliable energy" (oil and natural gas) produced in the Permian Basin. In September 2023, Pfluger's Congressional website said, "we cannot allow the radical climate lobby to infiltrate Texas middle schools and brainwash our children", claiming that liquefied natural gas is "not only...good for our economy, but it's good for the environment".

==== Social media ====
Climate misinformation has increased on social media in recent years, with researchers noting a shift to "New Denial" narratives, in which posts criticize solutions to climate change and their supporters rather than denying that climate change exists. Social media has an important role in communicating science to the public, with more than half (59% in 2026) of U.S. and UK (51% in 2025) adults getting news from it.

== Notable people who deny climate change ==
=== Politicians ===
Donald Trump on sea level rise

When they say that the seas will rise over the next 400 years — one-eighth of an inch, you know. Which means, basically you have a little more beachfront property, OK.

— Donald Trump, 2 June 2024
(NOAA expected sea levels along U.S. coastlines to rise an average of 10 to 12 inches within three decades.)
A con job and a scam

[Climate change] is the greatest con job ever perpetrated on the world, in my opinion. ... All of these predictions...were made by stupid people that of course their country's fortunes and given those same countries, no chance for success. If you don't get away from this green scam, your country is going to fail.

— US President Donald Trump
to the UN General Assembly,
23 September 2025

Acknowledgment of climate change by politicians, while expressing uncertainty as to how much of it is due to human activity, has been described as a new form of climate denial, and "a reliable tool to manipulate public perception of climate change and stall political action".

In 2010, Donald Trump said, "With the coldest winter ever recorded, with snow setting record levels up and down the coast, the Nobel committee should take the Nobel Prize back from Al Gore....Gore wants us to clean up our factories and plants in order to protect us from global warming, when China and other countries couldn't care less. It would make us totally noncompetitive in the manufacturing world, and China, Japan and India are laughing at America's stupidity." In 2012, Trump tweeted, "The concept of global warming was created by and for the Chinese in order to make U.S. manufacturing non-competitive." By the early 2020s, Trump's administration generally changed the framing of the issue from denial to dismissal: diminishing, ridiculing or rejecting the idea that climate change should be mitigated or even studied. On September 23, 2025, in his first address to the United Nations General Assembly during his second term in office, Trump called the UN's predictions about climate change exaggerated, incorrect, and "the greatest con job perpetrated by the world". He falsely said that renewable energy sources such as solar and wind power "don't work", are unreliable, and more expensive than fossil fuels.

On January 21, 2015, Jim Inhofe returned to chairing the Senate Committee on Environment and Public Works as part of a new Republican majority in the Senate. In response to NOAA and NASA reports that 2014 had been the warmest year globally in the temperature record, he said, "we had the coldest in the western hemisphere in the same time frame", and attributed changes to a 30-year cycle, not human activity. In a debate the same day about a bill for the Keystone XL pipeline, Inhofe endorsed an amendment proposed by Senator Sheldon Whitehouse, "Climate change is real and not a hoax", which passed 98–1. Inhofe clarified his view, saying, "Climate is changing and climate has always changed and always will. There is archaeological evidence of that, there is biblical evidence of that, there is historical evidence of that", but added, "there are some people who are so arrogant to think they are so powerful they can change climate." On February 26, 2015, Inhofe brought a snowball to the Senate floor and tossed it before delivering remarks in which he said that environmentalists keep talking about global warming even though it keeps getting cold.

Tom Coburn on the 2015 Paris Agreement (a global effort to reduce carbon emissions), claiming it was 'poorly negotiated', in an interview with TheStreet.

In 2017, former U.S. Senator Tom Coburn discussed the Paris Agreement and denied the scientific consensus on human-caused global warming. He claimed that sea level rise had been no more than 5 mm in 25 years, and asserted there was now global cooling. In 2013, he said, "I am a global warming denier. I don't deny that."

Republican Jim Bridenstine, the first elected politician to serve as NASA administrator, had previously said that global temperatures were not rising. But a month after the Senate confirmed his NASA position in April 2018, he acknowledged that human emissions of greenhouse gases are raising global temperatures.

During a May 2018 meeting of the United States House Committee on Science, Space, and Technology, Representative Mo Brooks claimed that sea level rise is caused not by melting glaciers but rather by coastal erosion and silt that flows from rivers into the ocean.

In 2019, Ernesto Araújo, the minister of foreign affairs appointed by Brazil's newly elected president Jair Bolsonaro, called global warming a plot by "cultural Marxists" and eliminated the ministry's climate change division.

Avatar of Rep. Marjorie Taylor Greene

Rep. Marjorie Taylor Greene
(@RepMTG)
tweeted:

We live on a spinning planet that rotates around a much bigger sun along with other planets and heavenly bodies rotating around the sun that all create gravitational pull on one another while our galaxy rotates and travels through the universe. Considering all of that, yes our climate will change, and it's totally normal! ... Don't fall for the scam, fossil fuels are natural and amazing.

Apr 15, 2023

An April 15, 2023, tweet by Republican U.S. Representative Marjorie Taylor Greene said climate change was a "scam", that "fossil fuels are natural and amazing", and that "there are some very powerful people that are getting rich beyond their wildest dreams convincing many that carbon is the enemy". Her tweet included a chart that omitted carbon dioxide and methane—the two most dominant greenhouse gas emissions.

A 2024 analysis found 100 U.S. representatives and 23 U.S. senators—23% of the 535 members of Congress—to be climate change deniers, all the deniers being Republicans.

On 29 July 2025, the chief administrator of the US Environmental Protection Agency announced that the Trump administration would rescind the 2009 endangerment finding, which concluded that planet-warming greenhouse gases pose a threat to public health. (The endangerment finding is the scientific determination that underpins the U.S. government's legal authority to combat climate change.) A 13 August Carbon Brief fact-check concluded that there were at least 100 false or misleading statements in the Trump administration's A Critical Review of Impacts of Greenhouse Gas Emissions on the U.S. Climate, published on 23 July to support rescinding of the endangerment finding. On 30 August, Climate Experts' Review of the DOE Climate Working Group Report was published as a compendium of comments from 85 climate experts to counter the government's Critical Review. The government's five-member Climate Working Group that authored the Critical Review was dissolved by 5 September in response to a lawsuit filed by the Environmental Defense Fund and Union of Concerned Scientists. On 17 September, the National Academies of Sciences, Engineering, and Medicine (NASEM) published a 137-page paper stating that "the evidence for current and future harm to human health and welfare created by human-caused GHGs is beyond scientific dispute".

=== Scientists ===
American and New Zealand climate scientist Kevin Trenberth has published widely on climate change science and fought back against climate change misinformation for decades. He describes in his memoirs his "close encounters with deniers and skeptics"—with fellow meteorologists or climate change scientists. These included Richard Lindzen ("he is quite beguiling but is criticized as "intellectually dishonest" by his peers"; Lindzen was a professor of meteorology at MIT and has been called a contrarian in relation to climate change and other issues.), Roy Spencer (who has "repeatedly made errors that always resulted in lower temperature trends than were really present"), John Christy ("his decisions on climate work and statements appear to be heavily colored by his religion"), Roger Pielke Jr, Christopher Landsea, Pat Michaels ("long associated with the Cato Institute, he changed his bombastic tune gradually over time as climate change became more evident").

Sherwood B. Idso is a natural scientist and is the president of the Center for the Study of Carbon Dioxide and Global Change, which rejects the scientific consensus on climate change. In 1982 he published his book Carbon Dioxide: Friend or Foe?, which said increases in CO_{2} would not warm the planet, but would fertilize crops and were "something to be encouraged and not suppressed".

William M. Gray was a climate scientist (emeritus professor of atmospheric science at Colorado State University) who supported climate change denial: he agreed that global warming was taking place, but argued that humans were responsible for only a tiny portion of it and it was largely part of the Earth's natural cycle.

In 1998, Frederick Seitz, an American physicist and former National Academy of Sciences president, wrote the Oregon Petition, a controversial document in opposition to the Kyoto Protocol. The petition and accompanying "Research Review of Global Warming Evidence" claimed that "We are living in an increasingly lush environment of plants and animals as a result of the carbon dioxide increase. [...] This is a wonderful and unexpected gift from the Industrial Revolution". In their book Merchants of Doubt, the authors write that Seitz and a group of other scientists fought the scientific evidence and spread confusion on many of the most important issues of our time, like the harmfulness of tobacco smoke, acid rains, CFCs, pesticides, and global warming.

== Lobbying and related activities ==
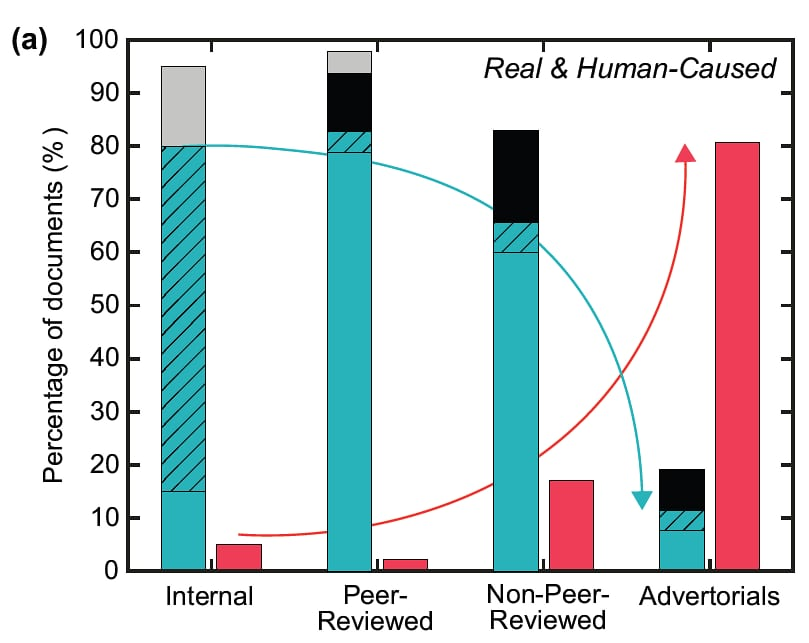
Percentage of documents taking each overall position on climate change as real and human-caused, 1977–2014. Acknowledgement (lines indicate the inclusion of reasonable doubt) Acknowledgement and doubt Reasonable doubt Doubt

Efforts to lobby against environmental regulation have included campaigns to manufacture doubt about the science behind climate change and to obscure the scientific consensus and data. These have undermined public confidence in climate science.

As of 2015, the climate change denial industry was most powerful in the U.S. Efforts by climate change denial groups played a significant role in the United States' rejection of the Kyoto Protocol in 1997.

=== Government ===
In what The Guardian said "seems to be the latest incident in a crackdown on discussing the climate crisis", the Trump administration in 2025 instructed employees of the US Department of Energy to avoid using terms such as "climate change", "decarbonization", "sustainable", "emissions", "green", "energy transition", "'clean' or 'dirty' energy" and "carbon/CO2 'footprint'". In January 2025, Trump stripped mentions of climate change and global heating from government websites and ended many climate-focused government programs.

=== Fossil fuel companies and other private sector actors ===
The fossil fuel industry has been waging a decades-long, multi-billion-dollar disinformation campaign denying climate change and spreading doubt on climate science, aimed at blocking climate action and phasing out fossil fuels.

Research conducted at an Exxon archival collection at the University of Texas and interviews with former Exxon employees indicate that the company's scientific opinion and its public posture toward climate change were contradictory. A systematic review of Exxon's climate modeling projections concluded that in private and academic circles since the late 1970s and early 1980s, ExxonMobil predicted global warming correctly and skillfully, correctly dismissed the possibility of a coming ice age in favor of a "carbon dioxide induced super-interglacial", and reasonably estimated how much CO_{2} would lead to dangerous warming.

Between 1989 and 2002, the Global Climate Coalition, a group of mainly U.S. businesses, used aggressive lobbying and public relations tactics to oppose action to reduce greenhouse gas emissions and fight the Kyoto Protocol. Large corporations and trade groups from the oil, coal and auto industries financed the coalition. The New York Times reported, "even as the coalition worked to sway opinion [toward skepticism], its own scientific and technical experts were advising that the science backing the role of greenhouse gases in global warming could not be refuted". In 2000, the Ford Motor Company was the first company to leave the coalition as a result of pressure from environmentalists. Daimler-Chrysler, Texaco, the Southern Company and General Motors subsequently left the GCC. It closed in 2002.

From January 2009 through June 2010, the oil, coal and utility industries spent $500 million in lobby expenditures in opposition to legislation to address climate change.

A study in 2022 traced the history of an influential group of economic consultants hired by the petroleum industry from the 1990s to the 2010s to estimate the costs of various proposed climate policies. The economists used models that inflated predicted costs while ignoring policy benefits, and their results were often portrayed to the public as independent rather than industry-sponsored. Their work played a key role in undermining numerous major climate policy initiatives in the US over a span of decades. This study illustrates how the fossil fuel industry has funded biased economic analyses to oppose climate policy.

==== ExxonMobil ====
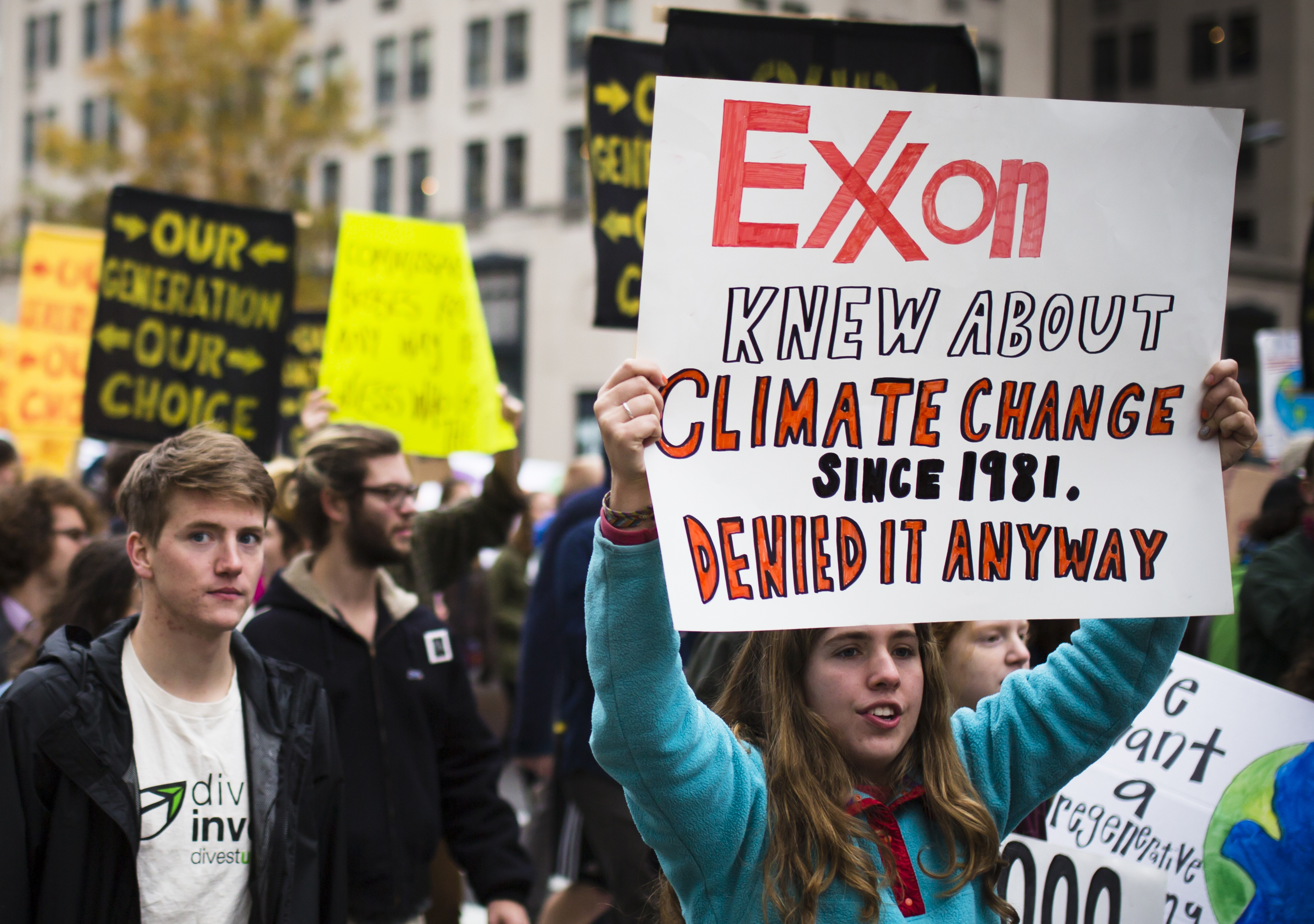
A protestor demonstrating as part of the "Exxon knew" movement in Washington, DC in 2015

From the 1980s to the mid 2000s, the American multinational oil and gas corporation ExxonMobil was a leader in climate change denial, opposing regulations to curtail global warming. For example, ExxonMobil was a significant influence in preventing ratification of the Kyoto Protocol by the United States. ExxonMobil funded organizations critical of the Kyoto Protocol and seeking to undermine public opinion about the scientific consensus that global warming is caused by the burning of fossil fuels. Of the major oil corporations, ExxonMobil has been the most active in the debate surrounding climate change. According to a 2007 analysis by the Union of Concerned Scientists, the company used many of the same strategies, tactics, organizations, and personnel the tobacco industry used in its denials of the link between lung cancer and smoking.

ExxonMobil has funded, among other groups, the Competitive Enterprise Institute, George C. Marshall Institute, Heartland Institute, the American Legislative Exchange Council and the International Policy Network. Between 1998 and 2004, ExxonMobil granted $16 million to advocacy organizations which disputed the impact of global warming. From 1989 until April 2010, ExxonMobil and its predecessor Mobil purchased regular Thursday advertorials in The New York Times, The Washington Post, and The Wall Street Journal claiming that the science of climate change was unsettled.

An analysis conducted by The Carbon Brief in 2011 found that 9 out of 10 of the most prolific authors who cast doubt on climate change or speak against it had ties to ExxonMobil. Greenpeace have said that Koch industries invested more than US$50 million in the past 50 years on spreading doubts about climate change.

=== Attacks and threats towards scientists ===
Climate change deniers attacked the work of climate scientist Michael E. Mann for years. On 8 February 2024, Mann won a $1 million judgment for punitive damages in a defamation lawsuit filed in 2012 against bloggers who attacked his hockey stick graph of the Northern Hemisphere temperature rise. One of the bloggers had called Mann's work "fraudulent", contrary to numerous investigations that had already cleared Mann of any misconduct and supported the validity of his research.

After Elon Musk's 2022 takeover of Twitter (now X), key figures at the company who ensured trusted content was prioritized were removed, and climate scientists received a large increase in hostile, threatening, harassing, and personally abusive tweets from deniers.

In 2023, increases in climate change denial were reported, particularly on the far right. Climate change deniers threatened meteorologists, accusing them of causing a drought, falsifying thermometer readings, and cherry-picking warmer weather stations to misrepresent global warming. Also in 2023, CNN reported that meteorologists and climate communicators worldwide were receiving increased harassment and false accusations that they were lying about or controlling the weather, inflating temperature records to make climate change seem worse, and changing color palettes of weather maps to make them look more dramatic. The German television news service Tagesschau called this a global phenomenon.

=== Funding for deniers ===
Journalists reported in 2015 that oil companies had known since the 1970s that burning oil and gas could cause climate change but nonetheless funded deniers for years.

Several large fossil fuel corporations provide significant funding for attempts to mislead the public about climate science's trustworthiness. ExxonMobil and the Koch family foundations have been identified as especially influential funders of climate change contrarianism. The bankruptcy of the coal company Cloud Peak Energy revealed it funded the Institute for Energy Research, a climate denial think tank, as well as several other policy influencers.

After the IPCC released its Fourth Assessment Report in 2007, the American Enterprise Institute (AEI) offered British, American, and other scientists $10,000 plus travel expenses to publish articles critical of the assessment. The institute had received more than $1.6 million from Exxon, and its vice-chairman of trustees was former Exxon head Lee Raymond. Raymond sent letters that alleged the IPCC report was not "supported by the analytical work". More than 20 AEI employees worked as consultants to the George W. Bush administration.

The authors of the 2010 book Merchants of Doubt provide documentation for the assertion that professional deniers have tried to sow seeds of doubt in public opinion in order to halt any meaningful social or political action to reduce the impact of human carbon emissions. That only half of the American population believes global warming is caused by human activity could be seen as a victory for these deniers. One of the authors' main arguments is that most prominent scientists who have opposed the near-universal consensus are funded by industries, such as automotive and oil, that stand to lose money by government actions to regulate greenhouse gases.

The Global Climate Coalition was an industry coalition that funded several scientists who expressed skepticism about global warming. In 2000, several members left the coalition when they became the target of a national divestiture campaign run by John Passacantando and Phil Radford at Ozone Action. When Ford Motor Company left the coalition, it was regarded as "the latest sign of divisions within heavy industry over how to respond to global warming". After that, between December 1999 and early March 2000, the GCC was deserted by Daimler-Chrysler, Texaco, energy firm the Southern Company and General Motors. The Global Climate Coalition closed in 2002.

In early 2015, several media reports emerged saying that Willie Soon, a popular scientist among climate change deniers, had failed to disclose conflicts of interest in at least 11 scientific papers published since 2008. They reported that he received a total of $1.25 million from ExxonMobil, Southern Company, the American Petroleum Institute, and a foundation run by the Koch brothers. Documents obtained by Greenpeace under the Freedom of Information Act show that the Charles G. Koch Foundation gave Soon two grants totaling $175,000 in 2005/6 and again in 2010. Grants to Soon between 2001 and 2007 from the American Petroleum Institute totaled $274,000, and between 2005 and 2010 from ExxonMobil totaled $335,000. The Mobil Foundation, the Texaco Foundation, and the Electric Power Research Institute also funded Soon. Acknowledging that he received this money, Soon said that he had "never been motivated by financial reward in any of my scientific research". In 2015, Greenpeace disclosed papers documenting that Soon failed to disclose to academic journals funding including more than $1.2 million from fossil fuel industry-related interests, including ExxonMobil, the American Petroleum Institute, the Charles G. Koch Charitable Foundation, and the Southern Company.

Science editor-in-chief Donald Kennedy has said that deniers such as Michaels are lobbyists more than researchers, and "I don't think it's unethical any more than most lobbying is unethical". He said donations to deniers amount to "trying to get a political message across".

Robert Brulle analyzed the funding of 91 organizations opposed to restrictions on carbon emissions, which he called the "climate change counter-movement". Between 2003 and 2013, the donor-advised funds Donors Trust and Donors Capital Fund, combined, were the largest funders, accounting for about a quarter of the funds, and the American Enterprise Institute was the largest recipient, with 16% of the total funds. The study also found that the amount of money donated to these organizations by means of foundations whose funding sources cannot be traced had risen.

=== Global patterns ===
Climate change denial is considered the world's most studied science denial. Energy industry structure plays a significant role in countries' denial rates. Countries with state-managed energy sectors show much lower rates of climate change denial than those with privatized systems, where private lobbying can filter skeptical coverage into media and policy.

Brazil had the lowest rate of skeptical mentions in media coverage, at around 1-3%. 80% of its power is hydroelectric, and the state-owned Petrobras monopolizes the energy industry. France generates 80% of its energy through nuclear power, leaving little room for oil and gas lobbying.

Countries with the highest rates of denial are English-speaking. A review of 161 academic studies on climate denial found that 42% focused on the US, 20% on the UK, and 8% on Australia. Developing countries do not have the same level of research into such topics and generally have direr economic issues to contend with.

In the UK, the second-largest source of climate change denial after the US, high denial rates follow recognizable patterns. High levels of lobbying filter skeptical coverage into local news, with 2,340 lobbyists earning $90 million in fees and another $259 million from think tanks. The UK also has a strong tabloid culture, particularly the Daily Mail and Daily Express, with political agendas. In 2009, Lord Nigel Lawson, former Chancellor of the Exchequer, founded the Global Warming Policy Foundation to counter the climate change movement. One of its offshoots, Net Zero Watch, has focused on promoting the idea that renewable energy is too expensive for the UK public. As of 2015, two out of five UK residents believed that climate change is still contested by scientists, with skepticism overrepresented among the elderly, those from poor socioeconomic backgrounds, conservatives, and men. Research has characterized the UK as a "pivotal outlier" in European Union climate negotiations, sometimes pushing for higher ambition while also blocking specific measures like binding national renewable energy targets for 2030.

Nor is the rest of Europe is in full agreement on climate change. French politician Claude Allègre published L'imposture climatique (The Climate Fraud) in 2010. In Russia, climate action is portrayed as a Western agenda aimed at keeping the rest of the world poor. In Germany, the car industry lobbies heavily against EU emission policy. Even Sweden, a country known for progressive policy, has significant lobbying efforts aimed at maintaining its forestry industry.

Tactics have shifted from outright denial to "manufacturing doubt", attempting to create uncertainty to establish that any policy action would be premature and costly. This involves consensus denial, claiming scientists do not collectively agree; impact denial, saying human-caused warming is very minor; and trend denial, claiming warming is a natural progression of the earth's atmosphere. Companies greenwash, claiming to be environmentally friendly while actually engaging in harmful practices. There is also technological optimism, claiming future technology will combat climate change quickly and cheaply, so no action need be taken now. Finally, nations engage in "whataboutism", pointing to other nations that might not be at the same level of environmental awareness and would therefore be at an economic advantage.

== Effects on public opinion ==
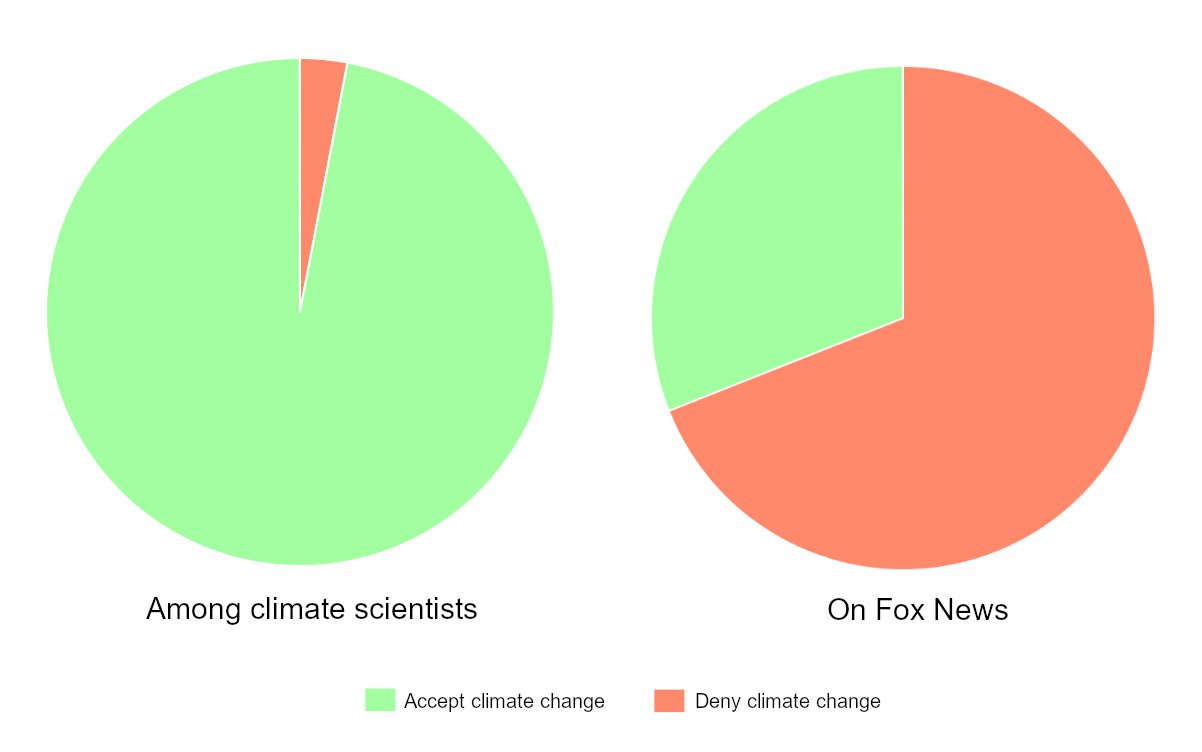
False balance in climate science: Representation of climate change skeptics among climate scientists (97% believing climate change to be real, 3% denying), and American Fox News channel guests (31% real, 69% denying). Based on IPCC report coverage between August 1, 2013, and October 1, 2013.

Public opinion on climate change is significantly affected by media coverage of climate change and the effects of climate change denial campaigns. Campaigns to undermine public confidence in climate science have decreased public belief in climate change, which in turn has affected legislative efforts to curb CO_{2} emissions.

Climate change conspiracy theories and denial have resulted in poor action or no action at all to effectively mitigate the damage done by global warming. 40% of Americans believed (ca. 2017) that climate change is a hoax even though 100% of climate scientists (as of 2019) believe it is real.

A study in 2015 stated: "Exposure to conspiracy theories reduced people's intentions to reduce their carbon footprint, relative to people who were given refuting information."

Manufactured uncertainty over climate change, the fundamental strategy of climate change denial, has been very effective, particularly in the U.S. It has contributed to low levels of public concern and to government inaction worldwide. A 2010 Angus Reid poll found that global warming skepticism in the U.S., Canada, and the United Kingdom has been rising. There may be multiple causes of this trend, including a focus on economic rather than environmental issues, and a negative perception of the United Nations and its role in discussing climate change.

According to Tim Wirth, "They patterned what they did after the tobacco industry. ... Both figured, sow enough doubt, call the science uncertain and in dispute. That's had a huge impact on both the public and Congress." American media has propagated this approach, presenting a false balance between climate science and climate skeptics. In 2006 Newsweek reported that most Europeans and Japanese accepted the consensus on scientific climate change, but only one third of Americans thought human activity plays a major role in climate change; 64% believed that scientists disagreed about it "a lot".

Deliberate attempts by the Western Fuels Association "to confuse the public" have succeeded. This has been "exacerbated by media treatment of the climate issue". According to a 2012 Pew poll, 57% of Americans are unaware of, or outright reject, the scientific consensus on climate change. Some organizations promoting climate change denial have asserted that scientists are increasingly rejecting climate change, but this is contradicted by research showing that 97% of published papers endorse the scientific consensus, and that percentage is increasing with time.

On the other hand, global oil companies have begun to acknowledge the existence of climate change and its risks. Still, top oil firms are spending millions lobbying to delay, weaken, or block policies to tackle climate change.

Manufactured climate change denial is also influencing how scientific knowledge is communicated to the public. According to climate scientist Michael E. Mann, "universities and scientific societies and organizations, publishers, etc.—are too often risk averse when it comes to defending and communicating science that is perceived as threatening by powerful interests".

=== United States ===
Results of a survey in 31 countries of public opinion, specifically among Facebook users, on the causes of climate change

Results of a survey overseen by the United Nations Development Programme on belief in whether climate change presents a climate emergency

Opinion about human causation of climate change increased substantially with education among voters of the Democratic Party in the U.S., but not among voters of the Republican Party. Conversely, opinions favoring becoming carbon neutral declined substantially with age among Republicans, but not among Democrats.

National political divides on the seriousness of climate change consistently correlate with political ideology, with right-wing opinion being more negative (survey of 19 countries).

A study found that public climate change policy support and behavior are significantly influenced by public beliefs, attitudes and risk perceptions. As of March 2018 the rate of acceptance among U.S. TV forecasters that the climate is changing has increased to 95 percent. The number of local TV stories about global warming has also increased, by a factor of 15. Climate Central has received some credit for this, because it provides classes for meteorologists and graphics for TV stations.

Popular media in the U.S. gives greater attention to climate change skeptics than the scientific community as a whole, and the level of agreement within the scientific community has not been accurately communicated. In some cases, news outlets have let climate change skeptics instead of experts in climatology explain the science of climate change. US and UK media coverage differ from that in other countries, where reporting is more consistent with the scientific literature. Some journalists attribute the difference to climate change denial being propagated, mainly in the U.S., by business-centered organizations employing tactics worked out previously by the U.S. tobacco lobby.

Denial of climate change is most prevalent among white, politically conservative men in the U.S. In France, the U.S., and the U.K., climate change skeptics' opinions appear much more frequently in conservative news outlets than others, and in many cases those opinions are left uncontested.

In 2018, the National Science Teachers Association urged teachers to "emphasize to students that no scientific controversy exists regarding the basic facts of climate change".

=== Europe ===
At least 72% of Chinese, American and European respondents to a 2020−2021 European Investment Bank climate survey stated that climate change had an impact on everyday life.

Climate change denial has been promoted by several far-right European parties, including Spain's Vox, Finland's far-right Finns Party, Austria's far-right Freedom Party, and Germany's anti-immigration Alternative for Deutschland (AfD). Russia also spreads climate disinformation with the aim of blaming the Western Bloc.

In April 2023, French political scientist Jean-Yves Dormagen said that the modest and conservative classes were the most skeptical about climate change. In a study by the Jean-Jaurès Foundation published the same month, climate skepticism was compared to a new populism whose representative and spokesman is Steven E. Koonin.

== Responses to denialism ==
=== The role of emotions and persuasive argument ===
Temperature data: Global average temperature datasets from various scientific organizations show substantial agreement concerning the progress and extent of global warming: pairwise correlations of 1850+/1880+ datasets exceed 99.1%.

Causation: The Fourth National Climate Assessment ("NCA4", USGCRP, 2017) includes charts illustrating how human factors, especially accumulation in the atmosphere of greenhouse gases, are the predominant cause of observed global warming.

Presenting data and other facts is less effective in motivating people to act to mitigate climate change, than financial incentives and social pressure involved in showing people climate-related actions of other people.

The strongest factors in self-reported changes in opinion about global warming in the United States were Republican party identification, seeing others experience impacts of global warming, and learning more about global warming.

Climate denial "is not simply overcome by reasoned argument", because it is not a rational response. Attempting to overcome denial using techniques of persuasive argument, such as supplying a missing piece of information, or providing general scientific education may be ineffective. A person who is in denial about climate is most likely taking a position based on their feelings, especially their feelings about things they fear.

Academics have stated that "It is pretty clear that fear of the solutions drives much opposition to the science."

It can be useful to respond to emotions, including with the statement "It can be painful to realise that our own lifestyles are responsible", in order to help move "from denial to acceptance to constructive action."

=== Following people who have changed their position ===
Some climate change skeptics have changed their positions regarding global warming. Ronald Bailey, author of Global Warming and Other Eco-Myths (published in 2002), stated in 2005, "Anyone still holding onto the idea that there is no global warming ought to hang it up." By 2007, he wrote "Details like sea level rise will continue to be debated by researchers, but if the debate over whether or not humanity is contributing to global warming wasn't over before, it is now.... as the new IPCC Summary makes clear, climate change Pollyannaism is no longer looking very tenable."

Jerry Taylor promoted climate denialism for 20 years as former staff director for the energy and environment task force at the American Legislative Exchange Council (ALEC) and former vice president of the Cato Institute. Taylor began to change his mind after climate scientist James Hansen challenged him to reread some Senate testimony. He became President of the Niskanen Center in 2014, where he is involved in turning climate skeptics into climate activists, and making the business case for climate action.

Michael Shermer, the publisher of Skeptic magazine, reached a tipping point in 2006 as a result of his increasing familiarity with scientific evidence, and decided there was "overwhelming evidence for anthropogenic global warming". Journalist Gregg Easterbrook, an early skeptic of climate change who authored the influential book A Moment on the Earth, also changed his mind in 2006, and wrote an essay titled "Case Closed: The Debate About Global Warming is Over". In 2006, he stated, "based on the data I'm now switching sides regarding global warming, from skeptic to convert."

In 2009, Russian president Dmitri Medvedev expressed his opinion that climate change was "some kind of tricky campaign made up by some commercial structures to promote their business projects". After the devastating 2010 Russian wildfires damaged agriculture and left Moscow choking in smoke, Medvedev commented, "Unfortunately, what is happening now in our central regions is evidence of this global climate change."

Bob Inglis, a former US representative for South Carolina, changed his mind in around 2010 after appeals from his son on his environmental positions, and after spending time with climate scientist Scott Heron studying coral bleaching in the Great Barrier Reef.

Richard A. Muller, professor of physics at the University of California, Berkeley, and the co-founder of the Berkeley Earth Surface Temperature project, funded by Charles Koch Charitable Foundation, had been a prominent critic of prevailing climate science. In 2011, he stated that "following an intensive research effort involving a dozen scientists, I concluded that global warming was real and that the prior estimates of the rate of warming were correct. I'm now going a step further: Humans are almost entirely the cause."

"I used to be a climate-change skeptic", conservative columnist Max Boot admitted in 2018, one who believed that "the science was inconclusive" and that worry was "overblown". Now, he says, referencing the Fourth National Climate Assessment, "the scientific consensus is so clear and convincing."

=== Effective approaches to dialogue ===
Explaining the techniques of science denial and misinformation, by presenting "examples of people using cherrypicking or fake experts or false balance to mislead the public", has been shown to inoculate people somewhat against misinformation.

Dialogue focused on the question of how belief differs from scientific theory may provide useful insights into how the scientific method works, and how beliefs may have strong or minimal supporting evidence. Wong-Parodi's survey of the literature shows four effective approaches to dialogue, including "[encouraging] people to openly share their values and stance on climate change before introducing actual scientific climate information into the discussion."

=== Approaches with farmers ===
One study of climate change denial among farmers in Australia found that farmers were less likely to take a position of climate denial if they had experienced improved production from climate-friendly practices, or identified a younger person as a successor for their farm. Therefore, seeing positive economic results from efforts at climate-friendly agricultural practices, or becoming involved in intergenerational stewardship of a farm may play a role in turning farmers away from denial.

In the United States, rural climate dialogues sponsored by the Sierra Club have helped neighbors overcome their fears of political polarization and exclusion, and come together to address shared concerns about climate impacts in their communities. Some participants who start out with attitudes of anthropogenic climate change denial have shifted to identifying concerns which they would like to see addressed by local officials.

=== Statements of well known people calling for climate action ===
In May 2013 Charles, Prince of Wales took a strong stance criticising both climate change deniers and corporate lobbyists by likening the Earth to a dying patient. "A scientific hypothesis is tested to absolute destruction, but medicine can't wait. If a doctor sees a child with a fever, he can't wait for [endless] tests. He has to act on what is there."

=== Legal response ===
As of February 2024, there are at least 32 ongoing lawsuits in the United States seeking damages against the fossil fuel industry on the grounds that it spread climate change denialism despite knowing the risks.

In June 2025, UN Special Rapporteur Elisa Morgera released a report that cites climate disinformation as a major obstacle to action and, among other actions, calls for criminalization of climate disinformation and a ban on fossil-fuel lobbying and advertising.

== See also ==
- Agnotology – Study of culturally induced ignorance or doubt
- Anti-environmentalism
- Climate movement
- CO2 Coalition – Nonprofit conservative think tank and climate denial organization
- Environmental skepticism – Skepticism of environmentalism
- Individual action on climate change
- Motivated reasoning – Processing personal/social information
- Psychology of climate change denial
- Right-wing antiscience – Attitudes that reject science and the scientific method
- Semmelweis reflex – Cognitive bias
- Skeptical Science – Climate science blog to counter arguments by climate change deniers
- Fallacy – Argument that uses faulty reasoning
- Films:
  - Climate Change Denial Disorder, satirical parody film about a fictional disease
  - Before the Flood, documenting climate change denial and lobbying processes
