= Meisler =

Meisler is a surname of German origin, being a variant of the surname Meissler, which originated as an occupational surname for someone who used a chisel in their work. Notable people with the surname include:

- Frank Meisler (1925–2018), Israeli architect and sculptor
- Meryl Meisler (born 1951), American photographer
