= David Michaels (epidemiologist) =

American epidemiologist

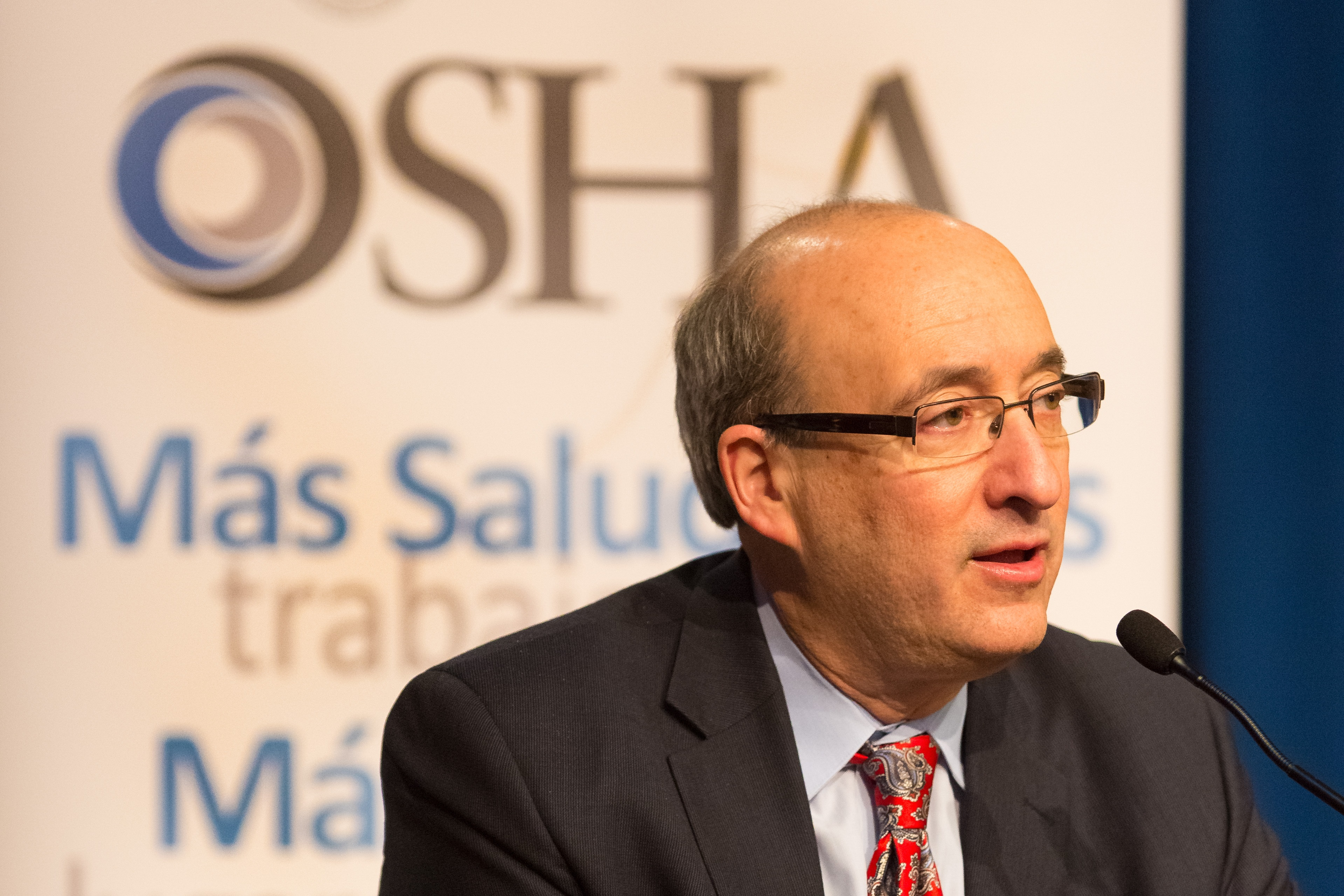

United States Assistant Secretary of Labor for Occupational Safety and Health
- In office December 8, 2009 – January 10, 2017
- President: Barack Obama
- Preceded by: Edwin Foulke
- Succeeded by: Douglas L. Parker (2021)

Personal details
- Born: New York City, New York, U.S.
- Education: City College of New York (BA); Columbia University (MPH, PhD)

David Michaels is an American epidemiologist and professor in the Departments of Environmental and Occupational Health and Epidemiology at the Milken Institute School of Public Health of the George Washington University. He held high-level, senate-confirmed public health positions in the administrations of Presidents Barack Obama and Bill Clinton, including a stint from 2009 to 2017 as the administrator of the Occupational Safety and Health Administration, the longest term of any OSHA administrator.

== Education and early life ==
Michaels graduated from the City College of New York, and holds a Master in Public Health (MPH) and a PhD from Columbia University. Before joining the faculty of the George Washington University, he taught at the CUNY School of Medicine and the Albert Einstein College of Medicine.

== Career ==
Following unanimous confirmation during 1998, Michaels was the Assistant Secretary for Environment, Safety, and Health for the United States Department of Energy until 2001. His initiative resulted in the Energy Employees Occupational Illness Compensation Program, which has provided over $32 billion in benefits to sick workers and the families of deceased workers since its inception in 2001.

During the HIV/AIDS epidemic, Michaels developed a widely used mathematical model to estimate the number of children orphaned by the disease. In addition, while employed at Montefiore Medical Center in the Bronx, NY, he helped found and directed the Epidemiology Unit at the Montefiore-Rikers Island Health Service, the first such unit at a jail in the United States.

From 2009 to January 2017, Michaels served as the Assistant Secretary of Labor for the Occupational Safety and Health Administration (OSHA). Nominated by President Barack Obama and unanimously confirmed by the U.S. Senate, Michaels served as OSHA's 12th Assistant Secretary, the longest serving administrator in OSHA's history.

As Assistant Secretary, Michaels issued new health standards protecting workers exposed to silica and beryllium, strengthened the agency's enforcement in high risk industries, expanded OSHA's whistleblower protection program, promoted common sense worker protection programs and standards, increased compliance assistance provided to small employers, and focused outreach on the vulnerable populations who are at greatest risk for work-related injury and illness. He also increased OSHA's capabilities in the areas of data analysis and program evaluation.

Michaels served as Chair of the Executive Committee of the US National Toxicology Program (NTP) from 2011 to 2017, and was a member of the NTP's Board of Scientific Counselors 2018-2022.

== Writings ==
External videos
- C-SPAN Book TV on which Michaels is interviewed by Lawrence Lessig on The Triumph of Doubt: Dark Money and the Science of Deception, Feb. 18, 2020

Michaels has written extensively on issues related to the integrity of scientific information that serves as the basis of public health and environmental regulation. His studies have been published in Science, The New England Journal of Medicine, and The BMJ.

He is the author of The Triumph of Doubt: Dark Money and the Science of Deception (Oxford University Press, 2020). In her review in the journal Science, Sheril Kirshenbaum described the book as "a tour de force that examines how frequently, and easily, science has been manipulated to discredit expertise and accountability on issues ranging from obesity and concussions to opioids and climate change." In Nature, Felicity Lawrence wrote that "The Triumph of Doubt is a brave and important book, raising the alarm about the systemic corruption of science."

Michaels wrote Doubt is Their Product: How Industry's Assault on Science Threatens Your Health (Oxford University Press, 2008). In his review in Science, Carl F. Cranor asks "Ever wonder why it has been so slow and difficult to reduce the health risks from tobacco, secondhand smoke, lead, beryllium, or chromium? David Michaels's excellent Doubt Is Their Product provides part of the explanation, showing numerous ways in which “the product defense industry” uses scientific (and pseudoscientific) arguments to undermine public health protections, corrupt the scientific record, and mislead the public."

== Awards ==
Michaels was awarded the American Association for the Advancement of Science's Award for Scientific Freedom and Responsibility during 2006. Michaels was a David P. Rall Award for Advocacy in Public Health winner, the 2009 John P. McGovern Science and Society Award of Sigma Xi, the American Conference of Governmental Industrial Hygienists (ACGIH®) William D. Wagner Award and William Steiger Memorial Award, Meritorious Service Award, and the Axelrod Prize in Public Health given by the University at Albany, SUNY School of Public Health. He is a fellow of the Collegium Ramazzini.

== Personal life ==
Michaels lives in the Washington, D.C., area with his wife Gail Dratch. He has two children, Joel Michaels and Lila Michaels. He is the son of photojournalist Ruth Gruber, step-brother of writer and activist Barbara Seaman, and cousin of science writer Dava Sobel and photographer Meryl Meisler.

== See also ==
- The Triumph of Doubt
- Doubt Is Their Product
- Energy Employees Occupational Illness Compensation Program
