= Energy Employees Occupational Illness Compensation Program =

The Energy Employees Occupational Illness Compensation Program Act (EEOICPA) was passed by the United States Congress in 2000 and is designed to compensate individuals who worked in nuclear weapons production, and as a result of occupational exposure, contracted certain illnesses. EEOICPA was signed into law by President Bill Clinton on October 30, 2000.

== Executive Order 13179 ==
Executive Order 13179 states the following:

Since World War II, hundreds of thousands of men and women have served their Nation in building its nuclear defense. In the course of their work, they overcame previously unimagined scientific and technical challenges. Thousands of these courageous Americans, however, paid a high price for their service, developing disabling or fatal illnesses as a result of exposure to beryllium, ionizing radiation, and other hazards unique to nuclear weapons production and testing. Too often, these workers were neither adequately protected from, nor informed of, the occupational hazards to which they were exposed.

Existing workers' compensation programs have failed to provide for the needs of these workers and their families. Federal workers' compensation programs have generally not included these workers. Further, because of long latency periods, the uniqueness of the hazards to which they were exposed, and inadequate exposure data, many of these individuals have been unable to obtain State workers' compensation benefits. This problem has been exacerbated by the past policy of the Department of Energy (DOE) and its predecessors of encouraging and assisting DOE contractors in opposing the claims of workers who sought those benefits. This policy has recently been reversed.

While the Nation can never fully repay these workers or their families, they deserve recognition and compensation for their sacrifices. Since the Administration's historic announcement in July 1999 that it intended to compensate DOE nuclear weapons workers who suffered occupational illnesses as a result of exposure to the unique hazards in building the Nation's nuclear defense, it has been the policy of this Administration to support fair and timely compensation for these workers and their survivors. The Federal Government should provide necessary information and otherwise help employees of the DOE or its contractors determine if their illnesses are associated with conditions of their nuclear weapons-related work; it should provide workers and their survivors with all pertinent and available information necessary for evaluating and processing claims; and it should ensure that this program minimizes the administrative burden on workers and their survivors, and respects their dignity and privacy. This order sets out agency responsibilities to accomplish these goals, building on the Administration's articulated principles and the framework set forth in the Energy Employees Occupational Illness Compensation Program Act of 2000. The Departments of Labor, Health and Human Services, and Energy shall be responsible for developing and implementing actions under the Act to compensate these workers and their families in a manner that is compassionate, fair, and timely. Other Federal agencies, as appropriate, shall assist in this effort.

== Program administration ==
The program is administered by four Federal agencies, and the Department of Labor (DOL) has the primary responsibility for administering the compensation program.

EEOICPA, as amended, has four sections:

- Part A establishes the compensation program.
- Part B covers individuals, or certain survivors of individuals, who worked at a covered facility and have developed beryllium sensitivity, chronic beryllium disease, chronic silicosis, or a radiogenic cancer. Compensation under Part B is a lump sum payment of $150,000, except for eligible individuals who already received payment under Section 5 of the Radiation Exposure Compensation Act (RECA). RECA individuals will only receive a lump sum payment of $50,000. In addition to the lump sum payment, compensation includes medical benefits from the date an individual files a claim.
- Part C contains a number of provisions relating to the administration of EEOICPA and its relationship to other Federal and State laws.
- Part D was repealed on October 28, 2004 and replaced with Part E, which is for certain individuals, or certain survivors of individuals, who worked at a Department of Energy facility or a uranium mine or mill and developed any illness that resulted from work-related exposure to toxins. Compensation under Part E is variable up to $250,000 based on wage loss, impairment, and survivorship.

Facilities that are covered under the Act are determined by DOL and the Department of Energy (DOE).

=== Radiation dose reconstruction ===
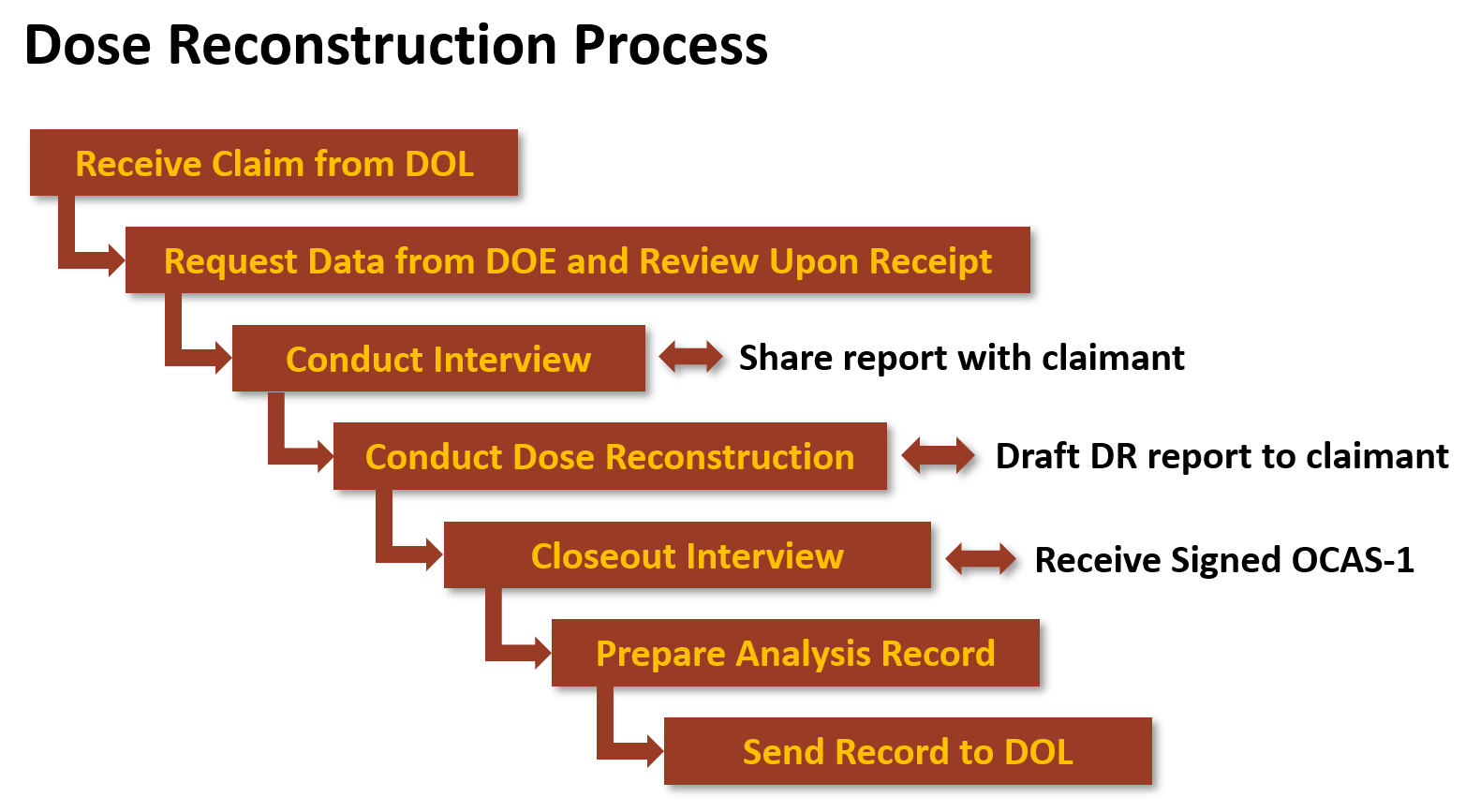
Dose reconstruction process for the Energy Employees Occupational Illness Compensation Program.

For claims filed under Part B for cancers that may have been caused by occupational radiation exposure, DOL sends the claim to the National Institute for Occupational Safety and Health (NIOSH) Division of Compensation Analysis and Support for a radiation dose reconstruction. NIOSH requests the energy employee's individual exposure records from DOE and interviews the claimant or survivors to obtain information to use in the dose reconstruction. NIOSH also collects all relevant data regarding the individual's work site, if available, to complete the dose reconstruction. Once the dose reconstruction is complete, NIOSH sends the dose reconstruction back to DOL and DOL makes compensation decisions.

All other Part B claims and all Part E claims remain at DOL for review and compensation determinations.

== Implementation ==
In July 2001, nine Energy Employee Compensation Resource Centers were opened as a joint initiative of Departments of Labor and Energy. They were staffed and resourced to assist workers and their families with the lodgement of claims. The Department of Energy was to provide exposure data and work documentation. There are currently eleven Resource Centers.

== Status of claims ==
As of September 15, 2019, EEOICP has provided $16,910,292,048 in compensation and medical bill payments to sick workers and their families.

As of January 12, 2023, EEOICP has provided $22,618,631,449 in compensation and medical bill payments to sick workers and their families, and represent a cohort of 136,515 unique workers.

== See also ==
- David Michaels (epidemiologist)
- Nuclear labor issues
- Radiation Exposure Compensation Act
- Compensation scheme for radiation-linked diseases (United Kingdom)
