= Radiation dose reconstruction =

A video describing dose reconstruction

Radiation dose reconstruction refers to the process of estimating radiation doses that were received by individuals or populations in the past as a result of particular exposure situations of concern. The basic principle of radiation dose reconstruction is to characterize the radiation environment to which individuals have been exposed using available information. In cases where radiation exposures can not be fully characterized based on available data, default values based on reasonable scientific assumptions can be used as substitutes. The extent to which the default values are used depends on the purpose of the reconstruction(s) being undertaken.

== Background ==
The methods and techniques used in dose reconstructions have been growing and evolving rapidly. It wasn’t until the late 1970s that dose reconstruction emerged as a scientific discipline and it has been used in practice in the United States for the last two decades. The scientific methods and practices used to complete dose reconstructions are often based on the standards published by international consensus organizations such as the International Commission on Radiological Protection.

When conducted properly, dose reconstruction is a scientifically valid process for estimating radiation dose received by an individual or group of individuals. It is commonly used in occupational epidemiological studies to determine the amount of radiation workers may have received as part of their employment. For these types of studies, dose reconstruction is similar to the process of estimating how much radiation current workers receive, for example at a nuclear facility, except dose reconstructions evaluate past exposures. The terms historical and retrospective often are used to describe a dose reconstruction. Dose estimation is the term sometimes used to describe the process used to determine radiation exposures to current populations or individuals.

Dose reconstruction methods have also commonly been applied in environmental settings to assess radionuclide releases into the environment from nuclear sites. One such environmentally focused study was published in 1983 by the U.S. Nuclear Regulatory Commission entitled Radiological Risk Assessment: A Textbook on Environmental Dose Analysis. This book was updated with major revisions in 2008 and it details the steps of radiological assessments, which uses similar methods and techniques as a dose reconstruction.

Dose reconstruction methods are not limited to just measuring exposures to radiation. Dose reconstruction principles can be used to reconstruct exposures to other hazardous materials and to determine the health effects of those toxins to populations or individuals.

== Radiation dose reconstruction elements ==
The dose reconstruction process has several basic elements, which have been identified as follows:

- Definition of exposure scenarios,
- Identification of exposure pathways,
- Development and implementation of methods of estimating dose,
- Evaluation of uncertainties in estimates of dose,
- Presentation and interpretation of results,
- Quality assurance and quality control.

=== Elements table ===
Basic element	Summary description
Definition of exposure scenarios	Activities of individuals in areas where radiation exposure could occur and characteristics of radiation environment in those areas
Identification of exposure pathways	Relevant pathways of external and internal exposure
Development and implementation of methods of estimating dose	Data, assumptions, and methods of calculation used to estimate dose from relevant exposure pathways in assumed scenarios
Evaluation of uncertainties in estimates of dose	Evaluation of effects on estimated dose of uncertainties in assumed exposure scenarios and uncertainties in models and data used to estimate dose in assumed scenarios, to obtain expression of confidence in estimated dose
Presentation and interpretation of results	Documentation of assumptions and methods of estimating dose and discussion of results in context of purpose of dose reconstruction
Quality assurance and quality control	Systematic and auditable documentation of dose reconstruction process and results

Summary of Basic Elements of Dose Reconstruction Process as found in A Review of the Dose Reconstruction Program of the Defense Threat Reduction Agency

== Research and applications ==
Radiation dose reconstruction methods are used to a large extent in occupational, environmental, and medical epidemiological research studies. The Centers for Disease Control and Prevention (CDC) has been involved in several dose reconstruction projects.

Several CDC agencies are involved in dose reconstruction projects: the Agency for Toxic Substances and Disease Registry (ATSDR), the National Center for Environmental Health (NCEH), and the National Institute for Occupational Safety and Health (NIOSH).

=== Superfund sites ===
The Agency for Toxic Substances and Disease Registry (ATSDR) conducts dose reconstructions in relation to work done at Superfund sites. ATSDR defines exposure-dose reconstruction as an approach that uses computational models and other approximation techniques to estimate cumulative amounts of hazardous substances internalized by individuals presumed to be or who are actually at risk from contact with substances associated with hazardous waste sites.

=== Exposure-dose reconstruction program ===
In March 1993, ATSDR established the Exposure-Dose Reconstruction Program (EDRP). EDRP represents a coordinated, comprehensive effort to develop sensitive, integrated, science-based methods for improving health scientists’ and assessors’ access to current and historical exposure-dose characterization. EDRP was created to confront the challenge that faced health scientists and assessors who have not always had access to information-especially historical information regarding an individual’s direct measure of exposure to and dose of chemicals associated with hazardous waste sites.

=== Epidemiological health studies ===
The National Center for Environmental Health (NCEH) coordinates program and conducts environmental epidemiological health studies using dose reconstruction principles. NCEH has undertaken a series of studies to assess the possible health consequences of off-site emissions of radioactive materials from DOE-managed nuclear facilities in the United States. Dose reconstruction as used by NCEH is defined as the process of estimating doses to the public from past releases to the environment of radionuclides or chemicals. These doses form the basis for estimating health risks. Past exposures are the focus of the NCEH studies.

=== Occupational energy research ===
The National Institute for Occupational Safety and Health (NIOSH) completes dose reconstructions as a component of ongoing worker health studies. The NIOSH Occupational Energy Research Program’s mission is to conduct relevant, unbiased research to identify and quantify health effects among workers exposed to ionizing radiation and other agents; to develop and refine exposure assessment methods; to effectively communicate study results to workers, scientists, and the public; to contribute scientific information for the prevention of occupational injury and illness; and to adhere to the highest standards of professional ethics and concern for workers’ health, safety and privacy.

=== Energy Employees Occupational Illness Compensation Program of 2000 ===
One of the largest mass applications of individual dose reconstruction principles is also being undertaken by NIOSH. NIOSH is the designated agency responsible for completing radiation dose reconstructions for individuals under the Energy Employees Occupational Illness Compensation Program of 2000 (the Act). Under the Act, individuals, and in some cases their survivors, are eligible for compensation for specified illnesses they received from occupational exposures to beryllium, asbestos, toxic materials, and radiation if they worked at a covered Department of Energy (DOE) facility or a facility that contracted with DOE to produce nuclear weapons or components, known as Atomic Weapons Employers (AWE). The program is administered by the Department of Labor. NIOSH’s responsibility under the Act is to determine the probability that an individual’s cancer was a result of their occupational radiation exposure at a DOE or AWE facility. This probability is determined by DOL and is based on the radiation dose reconstruction completed by NIOSH. The dose reconstructions are completed by individuals trained in the field of health physics.

The science behind the NIOSH dose reconstruction process has been published in the peer-reviewed professional journal Health Physics: The Radiation Safety Journal in July 2008. This edition of the Journal was dedicated entirely to the NIOSH Radiation Dose Reconstruction Program.

=== Nuclear Test Personnel Review ===
The Department of Veterans Affairs uses dose reconstructions to process claims under the Nuclear Test Personnel Review (NTPR) program. The NTPR is a Department of Defense program that works to confirm veteran participation in U.S. atmospheric nuclear tests from 1945 to 1962, and the occupation forces of Hiroshima and Nagasaki, Japan. If the veteran is a confirmed participant of these events, NTPR may provide either an actual or estimated radiation dose received by the veteran. The Defense Threat Reduction Agency completes the dose reconstructions for the NTPR program.
