= Doubt Is Their Product =

2008 book by David Michaels

Doubt is Their Product: How Industry's Assault on Science Threatens Your Health
- Author: David Michaels
- Publisher: Oxford University Press
- Publication date: 2008
- ISBN: 0199719764

Doubt is Their Product: How Industry's Assault on Science Threatens Your Health is a 2008 book by David Michaels, an epidemiologist and Professor in the Departments of Environmental and Occupational Health and Epidemiology at the Milken Institute School of Public Health of the George Washington University. Michaels served as Assistant Secretary of Labor for Occupational Safety and Health under U.S. President Barack Obama.

== Title ==
"Doubt is our product," Michaels quotes a cigarette executive as saying, "since it is the best means of competing with the 'body of fact' that exists in the minds of the general public. It is also the means of establishing a controversy." Michaels argues that, for decades, cigarette manufacturers knew that their product was hazardous to people's health, but hired mercenary scientists who "manufactured uncertainty by questioning every study, dissecting every method, and disputing every conclusion". In doing so the tobacco industry waged a campaign that "successfully delayed regulation and victim compensation for decades".

== Description ==
Doubt is Their Product documents how the tobacco industry's tactics spawned a multimillion dollar industry that is dismantling public health safeguards in areas far from tobacco. Product defense consultants, he argues, have increasingly skewed the scientific literature, manufactured and magnified scientific uncertainty, and influenced policy decisions to the advantage of polluters and the manufacturers of dangerous products. To keep the public confused about the hazards posed by climate change, second-hand smoke, asbestos, lead, plastics, and many other toxic materials, industry executives have hired unscrupulous scientists and lobbyists to dispute scientific evidence about health risks. In doing so, they have not only delayed action on specific hazards, but they have constructed barriers to make it harder for lawmakers, government agencies, and courts to respond to future threats.

Doubt is Their Product has been reviewed in Science, New Scientist, and Chemical and Engineering News.

== See also ==
- Triumph of Doubt (2020 book by David Michaels)
- Fear, uncertainty and doubt
- Health effects of tobacco
- Killer Company
- List of books about the politics of science
- Merchants of Doubt
- Scientific consensus
- Uncertainty
- Manufactured controversy
