= Tobacco industry playbook =

Propaganda techniques used by the tobacco industry

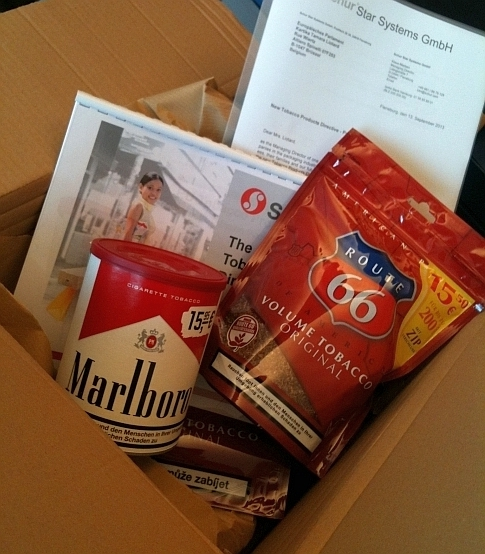
Gift offered by tobacco industry lobbyists to Dutch politician Kartika Liotard in September 2013

The tobacco industry playbook, also called the tobacco disinformation playbook or simply the tobacco strategy, describes a public relations strategy used by the tobacco industry in the 1950s to protect revenues in the face of mounting evidence of links between tobacco smoke and serious illnesses, primarily cancer. Such tactics were used even earlier, beginning in the 1920s, by the oil industry to support the use of tetraethyllead in gasoline. They continue to be used by other industries, notably the fossil fuel industry, even using the same PR firms and researchers.

Much of the playbook is known from industry documents made public by whistleblowers or as a result of the Tobacco Master Settlement Agreement. These documents are now curated by the UCSF Truth Tobacco Industry Documents project and are a primary source for much commentary on both the tobacco playbook and its similarities to the tactics used by other industries such as the fossil fuel industry.

A 1969 R. J. Reynolds internal memorandum noted, "Doubt is our product since it is the best means of competing with the 'body of fact' that exists in the mind of the general public." In Merchants of Doubt, Naomi Oreskes and Erik Conway documented the way that tobacco companies had campaigned over several decades to cast doubt on the scientific evidence of harm caused by their products, and noted the same techniques being used by other industries whose harmful products were targets of regulatory and environmental efforts. This is often linked to climate change denialism promoted by the fossil fuel industry: the same tactics were employed by fossil fuel groups such as the American Petroleum Institute to cast doubt on climate science from the 1990s and some of the same PR firms and individuals engaged to claim that tobacco smoking was safe, were later recruited to attack climate science.

== History ==
In 1953, Reader's Digest published a précis of an article from the Christian Herald titled "Cancer by the Carton", highlighting the emergent findings of epidemiologists including Richard Doll and Austin Bradford Hill. In response, US tobacco executives and John Hill, of public relations company Hill & Knowlton, held a crisis meeting at the New York Plaza Hotel. It led to the 1954 publication of A Frank Statement, an advertisement designed to cast doubt on the science showing serious health effects from smoking. Tactics include:

- Fabricating or falsifying scientific research and presenting it as legitimate research, e.g. using flawed methodologies that bias results, selectively publishing only favorable results (a type of research misconduct)
- Attacking and intimidating scientists who publish "inconvenient science" through threats to funding, promotion, tenure, and reputation.
- Manufacture "fear, uncertainty and doubt" by claiming that there is uncertainty about accepted scientific consensus, through actions like funding "junk science" studies designed to undermine scientific consensus, and repeating debunked claims
- Using affiliations with prestigious academic or professional organizations to influence research and advance economic, political, or ideological ends
- Political lobbying to manipulate government, influence policy, or control key decision-making positions, in defiance of scientific consensus, potentially posing a risk to public health and safety
- Resisting public regulation and emphasizing industry self-regulation and personal responsibility.
- Astroturfing: fabricating, or directly or indirectly funding, "front groups" to act on behalf of industrial interests. Entities are often deceptively named, and may falsely claim to represent grassroots opinion.

Documents such as Bad Science: A Resource Book were used to promulgate talking points intended to cast doubt on scientific independence and political interference.

== Influence ==
The playbook has been adopted by the fossil fuel industry, in its efforts to stave off global action on climate change, and by those seeking to undermine the United States Environmental Protection Agency (EPA) more generally. The manufacture and promotion of uncertainty, especially, has been identified as inspired directly by the tobacco industry.

Recognising that it had little or no credibility with the public, and concerned about mounting pressure to act on environmental tobacco smoke (ETS), the tobacco industry actively recruited fellow enemies of the EPA, setting up the "Advancement of Sound Science Coalition" (TASSC), a fake grassroots group. Its first director was Steve Milloy, previously of APCO, the consultancy firm employed by Philip Morris to set up TASSC. Milloy subsequently set up junkscience.com, a website which equates environmentalists with Nazis and now promotes climate change denial. Many of the consultants who worked for the tobacco industry, have also worked for fossil fuel companies against action on climate change. TASSC hired Frederick Seitz and Fred Singer, both now prominent in climate change denial. Greg Zimmerman found a 2015 presentation titled "Survival Is Victory: Lessons From the Tobacco Wars" by Richard Reavey of Cloud Peak Energy (and formerly of Philip Morris) in which Reavey explicitly acknowledged the parallels and urged fellow coal executives to accept the facts of climate change and work with regulators on solutions that would preserve the industry. Both Fred Singer and Frederick Seitz are prominent figures in climate change denial who previously worked for the tobacco industry.

Environmentalist George Monbiot identifies many groups that were funded by tobacco firms and subsequently by Exxon and other fossil fuel companies, and now actively take part in climate change denial, including the Competitive Enterprise Institute, the Cato Institute, The Heritage Foundation, the Hudson Institute, the Frontiers of Freedom Institute, the Reason Foundation, the Independent Institute, and George Mason University's Law and Economics Centre.

Opponents of vaping also identify elements of the tobacco playbook in the e-cigarette industry's response to health concerns. Tobacco companies took stakes in soft drinks companies and used the same tactics around colours and flavours that they had used to target young potential smokers. The soft drinks industry's attempts to avoid sugary beverage taxes and other government action to reduce obesity draws upon elements of the tobacco playbook, Coca-Cola has funded health researchers as part of Corporate Social Responsibility (CSR) programs; various provisions in these programs gave Coca-Cola the right to review research in advance of publication, with control over the study data, disclosure of results, and whether Coca-Cola funding was to be acknowledged. Some agreements stated explicitly that Coca-Cola could prevent publication. Research contracts issued as part of CSR programmes have thus allowed soft drinks manufacturers to bury inconvenient results.

A 2019 article in the Emory Law Journal made parallels to attempts by the National Football League to downplay the issue of chronic traumatic encephalopathy in American football, with the New York Times noting a number of tobacco figures involved in the NFL's defence. The World Health Organization has subsequently published a tobacco control playbook. The public relations strategies of Big Tech companies have often been compared with the tobacco industry playbook.

== See also ==
- Corporate propaganda
- COVID-19 vaccine misinformation and hesitancy
- Disinformation
- ExxonMobil climate change denial
- Fossil fuels lobby
- Health effects of tobacco
- Tobacco industry
