= Douglas L. Parker =

American lawyer

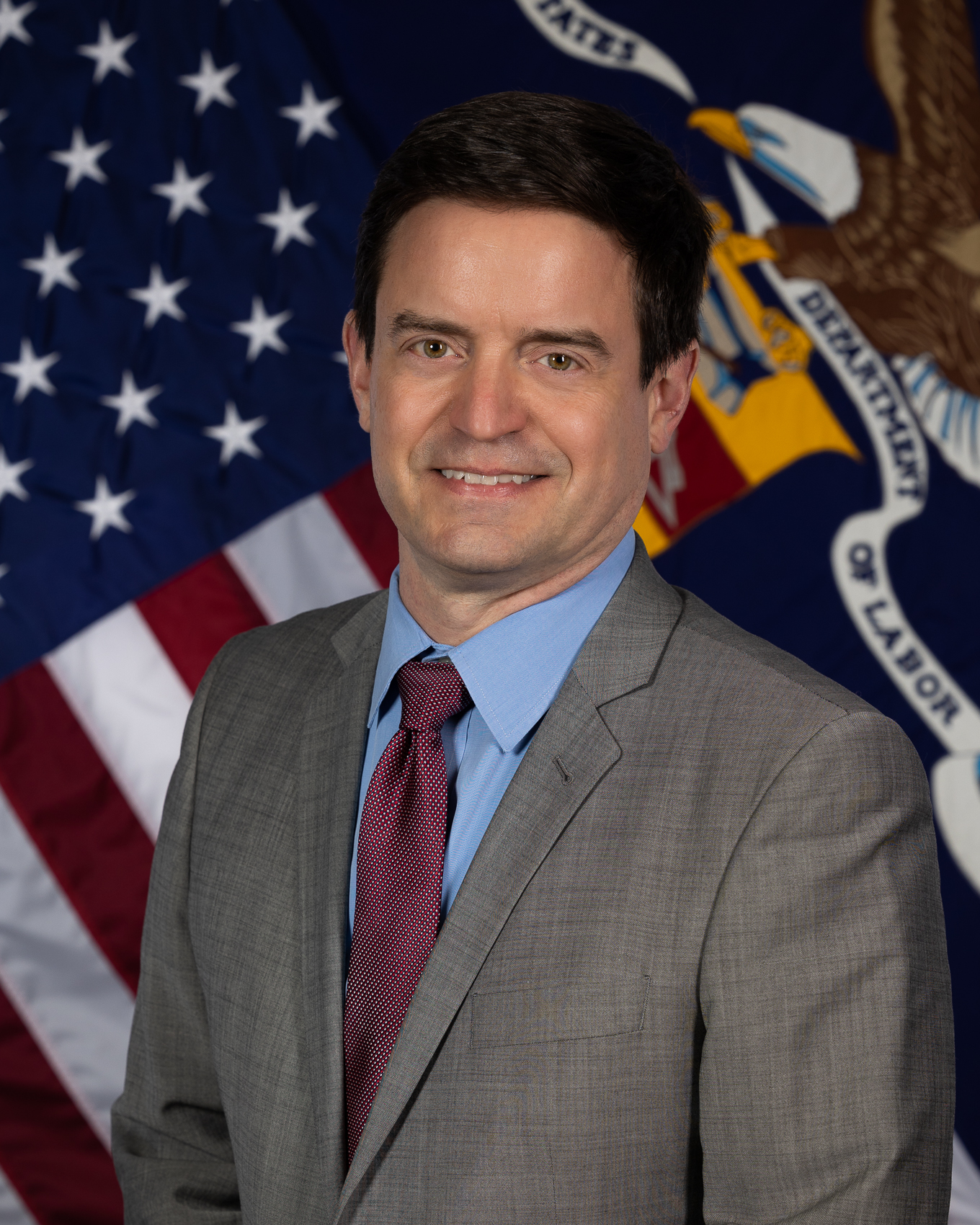

United States Assistant Secretary of Labor for Occupational Safety and Health
- In office November 3, 2021 – January 20, 2025
- President: Joe Biden
- Preceded by: David Michaels (2017)
- Succeeded by: David Keeling

Personal details
- Children: 2
- Education: James Madison University (BA); University of Virginia (JD)

Douglas L. Parker is an American attorney and government official who served as the Assistant Secretary of Labor for Occupational Safety and Health in the Biden administration from 2021 to 2025. He previously served as the chief of the California Division of Occupational Safety and Health.

== Education ==
Parker earned a Bachelor of Arts in history from James Madison University and his Juris Doctor from the University of Virginia School of Law.

== Career ==
Prior to law school, Parker worked in the private sector as a sales and marketing director, in communications for the Democratic National Committee, and was a staff assistant for Senator Paul Wellstone. Parker began his legal career as a staff attorney at the United Mine Workers of America. He was a partner with Mooney, Green, Saindon, Murphy and Welch in Washington, D.C.

=== Obama administration ===
During the Obama administration, Parker served as the Deputy Assistant Secretary for Policy in the Department of Labor's Mine Safety and Health Administration. He also held positions as a senior policy advisor and special assistant at the Department of Labor.

=== Cal/OSHA ===
From 2019 to 2021, Parker served as chief of the California Division of Occupational Safety and Health. He previously served as the executive director of Worksafe Inc.

=== Biden administration ===
Parker was a member of the Biden-Harris transition team focused on worker health and safety issues. On April 9, 2021, President Joe Biden nominated Parker to serve as the Assistant Secretary of Labor for Occupational Safety and Health. Hearings were held on his nomination before the Senate HELP Committee on May 27, 2021. The committee favorably reported his nomination to the Senate floor on June 16, 2021. Parker was confirmed by the Senate on October 25, 2021.

Parker was sworn in on November 3, 2021. Parker is the first U.S. Senate-confirmed assistant secretary of labor for occupational safety and health since the Obama administration.

== Personal life ==
Parker is married and has two daughters. Parker is originally from Bluefield, West Virginia, and grew up in Lynchburg, Virginia.
