= The Triumph of Doubt =

2020 non-fiction book by David Michaels

The Triumph of Doubt: Dark Money and the Science of Deception
- Author: David Michaels
- Language: English
- Publisher: Oxford University Press
- Publication date: 2020
- Pages: xii, 330
- ISBN: 978-0-19-092266-5
- OCLC: 1089898755

The Triumph of Doubt: Dark Money and the Science of Deception is a book by David Michaels that was published in 2020.

An adaptation of material from the book was published in January 2020 in Boston Review.

== Overview ==
Triumph of Doubt begins with an introductory first chapter and an overview chapter entitled "The Science of Deception." Most subsequent chapters then focus on ways that corporations have with greater or lesser success managed to obscure public understanding of scientific findings regarding specific types of products or concerns. For example, individual chapters focus on chemicals ("The Forever Chemicals," Chapter 3), concussions experienced by football players ("The NFL's Head Doctors," Chapter 4), opioids ("On Opioids," Chapter 7), climate change ("The Climate Denial Machine," Chapter 11), and sugar ("Sickeningly Sweet," Chapter 12).

== Reviews and interviews ==
Triumph of Doubt has been reviewed in Science Magazine, Nature, Undark Magazine, by the Union of Concerned Scientists, and in the San Francisco Review of Books (blog).

Interviews with Michaels about the book have been published in Salon, in the Chronicle of Higher Education, and in E&E News.

== Editions ==
- Michaels, David (2020). The triumph of doubt: dark money and the science of deception. Oxford; New York: Oxford University Press. ISBN 978-0-19-092266-5. OCLC 1089898755.

== See also ==
- Doubt Is Their Product: How Industry's Assault on Science Threatens Your Health (2008) by David Michaels
