= Manufactured controversy =

Contrived disagreement

A manufactured controversy (sometimes shortened to manufactroversy) is a contrived disagreement, typically motivated by profit or ideology, designed to create public confusion concerning an issue about which there is no substantial academic dispute. This concept has also been referred to as manufactured uncertainty.

== Mechanisms of manufacturing controversy and uncertainty ==
Manufacturing controversy has been a tactic used by ideological and corporate groups to "neutralize the influence of academic scientists" in public policy debates. Cherry picking of favorable data and sympathetic experts, aggrandizement of uncertainties within theoretical models, and false balance in media reporting contribute to the generation of manufactured controversies.

Alan D. Attie describes its process as "to amplify uncertainties, cherry-pick experts, attack individual scientists, marginalize the traditional role of distinguished scientific bodies and get the media to report "both sides" of a manufactured controversy."

Those manufacturing uncertainty may label academic research as "junk science" and use a variety of tactics designed to stall and increase the expense of the distribution of sound scientific information. Delay tactics are also used to slow the implementation of regulations and public warnings in response to previously undiscovered health risks (e.g., the increased risk of Reye's syndrome in children who take aspirin). Chief among these stalling tactics is generating scientific uncertainty, "no matter how powerful or conclusive the evidence", to prevent regulation.

Another tactic used to manufacture controversy is to cast the scientific community as intolerant of dissent and conspiratorially aligned with industries or sociopolitical movements that quash challenges to conventional wisdom. This form of manufactured controversy has been used by environmentalist advocacy groups, religious challengers of the theory of evolution, and opponents of global warming legislation.

== Legal effects ==
In the United States, the generation of manufactured uncertainty about scientific data has affected political and legal proceedings in many different areas. The Data Quality Act and the Supreme Court's Daubert standard have been cited as tools used by those manufacturing controversy to obfuscate scientific consensus.

Concerns have been raised regarding the conflicts of interest inherent in many types of industry regulation. For example, many industries, such as the pharmaceutical industry, are a major source of funding for the research necessary to achieve government regulatory approval for their product. In developing regulations, agencies such as the Food and Drug Administration and the Environmental Protection Agency rely heavily on unpublished studies from industry sources that have not been peer reviewed. This can allow a given industry control over the extent of available research, and the pace at which it is reviewable, when challenging scientific research that may threaten their business interests.

== Prominent examples ==
Examples of controversies that have been labeled manufactured controversies:

- Denial of the health risks of smoking tobacco by the tobacco industry
- Depletion of the ozone layer
- Climate change denial
- Contesting the development of skin cancer from exposure to ultraviolet radiation via sunlight and tanning lamps
- Denial of the Armenian genocide by the government of Turkey
- Rwandan genocide denial
- Vaccination controversies, particularly those alleging a causative relationship between the MMR vaccine or thiomersal in the development of autism spectrum disorders.
- AIDS denialism
- "Teach the Controversy" efforts of intelligent design supporters
- Carcinogenicity of hexavalent chromium

== See also ==
- Astroturfing
- Denialism
- Fear, uncertainty and doubt tactic used in business
- Merchants of Doubt book and Merchants of Doubt
- Scientific consensus
- Uncertainty
