= False balance =

Reporting on a fringe assertion as if it were legitimate debate

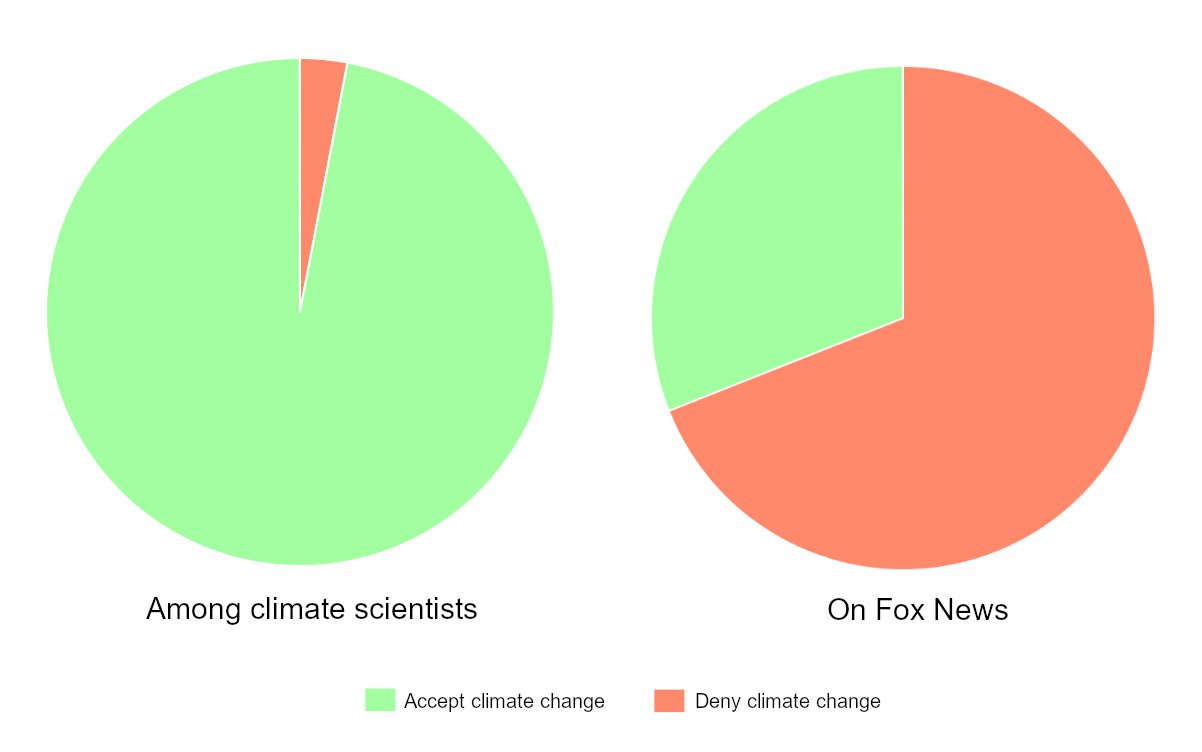
Among climate scientists in 2013, 97% of peer-reviewed papers that took a position on the cause of global warming said that humans are responsible, while 3% said they were not. Meanwhile, 69% of Fox News guests on Intergovernmental Panel on Climate Change stories in late 2013 were "climate contrarians".

False balance, known colloquially as bothsidesism, is a media bias in which journalists present an issue as being more balanced between opposing viewpoints than the evidence supports. Journalists may present evidence and arguments out of proportion to the actual evidence for each side, or may omit information that would establish one side's claims as baseless. False balance has been cited as a cause of misinformation.

False balance is a bias which often stems from an attempt to avoid bias and gives unsupported or dubious positions an illusion of respectability. It creates a public perception that some issues are scientifically contentious, although in reality they are not, therefore creating doubt about the scientific state of research. This can be exploited by interest groups such as corporations like the fossil fuel industry or the tobacco industry, or ideologically motivated activists such as vaccination opponents or creationists. False balance can be the result of viewpoint discrimination or political bias. Political bias can be evaluated relative to the median voter for particular topics.

== Description ==
False balance emerges from the ideal of journalistic objectivity, where factual news is presented in a way that allows the reader to make determinations about how to interpret the facts, and interpretations or arguments around those facts are left to the opinion pages. Because many newsworthy events have two or more opposing camps making competing claims, news media are responsible for reporting all (credible or reasonable) opposing positions, along with verified facts that may support one or the other side of an issue.

Unlike most other media biases, false balance may result from an attempt to avoid bias; producers and editors may consider treating competing viewpoints fairly—in proportion to their actual merits and significance—as equivalent to treating them equally, giving them equal time to present their views, even though one of the viewpoints may be overwhelmingly dominant. Media presents two opposing viewpoints on an issue as equally credible, or present a major issue on one side of a debate as having the same weight as a minor one on the other.

False balance can also originate from other motives such as sensationalism, where producers and editors may feel that a story portrayed as a contentious debate would be more commercially successful than a more accurate (or widely-agreed) account of the issue. Science journalist Dirk Steffens mocked the practice as comparable to inviting a flat Earther to debate with an astrophysicist over the shape of the Earth, as if the truth could be found somewhere in the middle. Liz Spayd of The New York Times wrote: "The problem with false balance doctrine is that it masquerades as rational thinking."

== Examples ==
Examples of false balance in reporting on science issues include the topics of human-caused climate change versus natural climate variability, the health effects of tobacco, the disproven relation between thiomersal and autism, alleged negative side effects of the HPV vaccine, evolution versus intelligent design, and immigration.

=== Climate change ===
Although the scientific community almost unanimously attributes a majority of the global warming since 1950 to the effects of the Industrial Revolution, there are a very small number – a few dozen scientists out of tens of thousands – who dispute the conclusion. Giving equal voice to scientists on both sides makes it seem like there is serious disagreement within the scientific community, when in fact there is an overwhelming scientific consensus on climate change that anthropogenic global warming exists.

=== MMR vaccine controversy ===
Observers have criticized the involvement of mass media in the MMR vaccine controversy, what is known as "science by press conference", alleging that the media provided Andrew Wakefield's study with more credibility than it deserved. A March 2007 paper in BMC Public Health by Shona Hilton, Mark Petticrew, and Kate Hunt postulated that media reports on Wakefield's study had "created the misleading impression that the evidence for the link with autism was as substantial as the evidence against". Earlier papers in Communication in Medicine and the British Medical Journal concluded that media reports provided a misleading picture of the level of support for Wakefield's hypothesis.

== See also ==
- Argumentum ad populum
- Centrism
- False equivalence
- FCC fairness doctrine
- Golden mean
- Horseshoe theory
- Journalistic objectivity
- Manufactured controversy
- Merchants of Doubt
