= Meryl Meisler =

American photographer

Meryl Meisler (born 1951) is an American photographer. In the 1970s she photographed in New York City nightclubs and in the 1980s she photographed residents of Bushwick, Brooklyn, while working as a public school teacher there.

== Life and work ==
Meisler was raised on Long Island, New York, and went to college in Wisconsin. She moved to New York City in 1975 and in the 1970s photographed nightlife in discotheques there such as Studio 54, Paradise Garage and Hurrah. Between 1981 and 1994 she taught at a public middle school in Bushwick, Brooklyn, New York and photographed the area's residents.

== Publications ==
- A Tale of Two Cities: Disco Era Bushwick. Brooklyn, NY: Bizarre, 2014. ISBN 978-0991014118. With an introduction by Catherine Kirkpatrick. Essays by Vanessa Mártir and Meisler. Poetry by Emanuel Xavier.
- Purgatory & Paradise: Sassy 70s Suburbia & the City. Brooklyn, NY: Bizarre, 2015. ISBN 978-0991014132. With an introduction by Catherine Kirkpatrick. Essays by Ernest Drucker, Amy Leffler and Meisler. Poetry by Emanuel Xavier.
- New York: Paradise Lost: Bushwick Era Disco. Woodstock, NY: Parallel Pictures, 2021. ISBN 978-0578831824. With an introduction by James Panero. Essays by Vanessa Mártir and Meisler. Poetry by Emanuel Xavier.
- Street Walker, Eyeshot, NY, 2024
