= Publications about disinformation =

This list of Publications about disinformation includes books, magazines, academic journals, and other media within disinformation research whose primary focus is understanding, countering, and dealing with disinformation, misinformation, and related topics.

== Books about disinformation ==
=== Disinformation Economy ===
- Diaz Ruiz, Carlos (March 25, 2025). Market-Oriented Disinformation Research: Digital Advertising, Disinformation and Fake News on Social Media. Oxfordshire, UK: Routledge. doi:10.4324/9781003506676. ISBN 978-1-032-82854-1.
- Oreskes, Naomi; Conway, Erik M. (2023). The Big Myth: How American Business Taught Us to Loathe Government and Love the Free Market. New York London Oxford New Delhi Sydney: Bloomsbury Publishing. ISBN 978-1-635-57357-2.
- Hasen, Richard L. (2022). Cheap Speech: How Disinformation Poisons Our Politics — and How to Cure It. Yale University Press. ISBN 978-0-300-25937-7.

=== Political disinformation ===
- Phiri, Christopher (2025). Political Disinformation and the Law: Safeguarding Freedom of Expression in Europe. London: Routledge.https://doi.org/10.4324/9781003622314. ISBN 9781041031086
- Ressa, Maria A.; Clooney, Amal Ramzi Alamuddin (2022). How to stand up to a dictator: the fight for our future. New York, NY: Harper, an imprint of HarperCollins Publishers. ISBN 978-0-06-325751-1.
- Naím, Moisés (2022). The Revenge of Power: How Autocrats Are Reinventing Politics for the 21st Century. St. Martin's Press. ISBN 978-1-250-27920-0.
- Stanford Internet Observatory; Center for an Informed Public; Digital Forensic Research Lab (2021). Beck, Eden (ed.). The Long Fuse: Misinformation and the 2020 Election. Stanford University.
- Phillips, Whitney; Milner, Ryan M. (2021). You are here: a field guide for navigating polarized speech, conspiracy theories, and our polluted media landscape. Cambridge: MIT Press. ISBN 978-0-262-36138-5.
- Rid, Thomas (2020). Active Measures: The Secret History of Disinformation and Political Warfare. Farrar, Straus and Giroux. ISBN 978-0-374-28726-9.
- Benkler, Yochai; Faris, Robert; Roberts, Hal (2018). Network propaganda: manipulation, disinformation, and radicalization in American politics. New York, NY: Oxford University Press. ISBN 978-0-19-092363-1.
- Andersen, Kurt (2017). Fantasyland: how America went haywire: a 500-year history (First ed.). New York: Random House. ISBN 978-1-4000-6721-3.
- Pacepa, Ion Mihai; Rychlak, Ronald J. (2013). Disinformation: Former Spy Chief Reveals Secret Strategies for Undermining Freedom, Attacking Religion, and Promoting Terrorism. Washington, D.C.: WND Books. ISBN 978-1-936488-60-5.
- Bittman, Ladislav (1985). The KGB and Soviet disinformation: an insider's view. Washington: Pergamon-Brassey's. ISBN 978-0-08-031572-0.
- Shultz, Richard H. (1984). Dezinformatsia: active measures in Soviet strategy. Washington: Pergamon-Brassey's. ISBN 978-0-08-031573-7.
- Bittman, Ladislav (1972). The deception game; Czechoslovak intelligence in Soviet political warfare (1st ed.). Syracuse, N.Y.: Syracuse University Research Corp.

==== Examples ====
- Mader, Julius (1968). Who's who in CIA; a biographical reference work on 3,000 officers of the civil and military branches of the secret services of the USA in 120 countries. Berlin: Julius Mader, 1066 Berlin W 66, Mauerstrasse 69.

=== Psychology of disinformation ===
- Shermer, Michael (2022). Conspiracy. Why the Rational Believe the Irrational. S.l.: Johns Hopkins University Press. ISBN 978-1-4214-4445-1.
- Greifeneder, Rainer (2021). The Psychology of Fake News: Accepting, Sharing, and Correcting Misinformation. Routledge. ISBN 978-0-429-29537-9.
- Wardle, Claire; Derakhshan, Hossein (2017). Information disorder: Toward an interdisciplinary framework for research and policy making. Strasbourg: Council of Europe.

=== Scientific disinformation ===
- Gibson, Connor (2022). Journalist Field Guide: Navigating Climate Misinformation (PDF). Climate Action Against Disinformation.
- Michaels, David (2020). The triumph of doubt: dark money and the science of deception. New York, NY: Oxford University Press. ISBN 978-0-19-092266-5.
- O'Connor, Cailin; Weatherall, James Owen (2018). The Misinformation Age: How False Beliefs Spread. Yale University Press. ISBN 978-0-300-23401-5.
- Latour, Bruno (2018). Down to earth: politics in the new climatic regime. Cambridge, UK Medford, MA, USA: Polity. ISBN 978-1-509-53056-4.
- Oreskes, Naomi; Conway, Erik M. (2010). Merchants of doubt: how a handful of scientists obscured the truth on issues from tobacco smoke to global warming. New York: Bloomsbury press. ISBN 978-1-59691-610-4., Reprint 2022.
- Michaels, David (2008). Doubt is their product: how industry's assault on science threatens your health. Oxford; New York: Oxford University Press. ISBN 978-0-19-530067-3.
- Carson, Rachel (2002) [1st. Pub. Houghton Mifflin, 1962]. Silent Spring. Mariner Books. ISBN 978-0-618-24906-0.. Silent Spring initially appeared serialized in three parts in the June 16, June 23, and June 30, 1962, issues of The New Yorker magazine.

== Journals ==
According to a library guide maintained by the European Commission, the following scholarly journals publish credible disinformation research:

- International Journal of Intelligence and Counterintelligence
- Journalism & Mass Communication Quarterly
- Journal of Communication
- Journal of Democracy
- Mass Communication & Society
- Media, Culture & Society
- Misinformation Review
- New Media & Society
- Social Media + Society

A 2022 bibliographic review identified additional journals through quantity of publications

- Applied Cognitive Psychology
- PLOS One
- Journal of Medical Internet Research

Other publications dealing with disinformation include:

- Big Data & Society (2014-), SAGE Publications
- International Journal of Intelligence and CounterIntelligence (1986-), Taylor & Francis
- Journal of Communication (1951-), Oxford University Press
- Journal of Democracy (1990-2025), National Endowment for Democracy
- Journal of Public Policy & Marketing, SAGE Publications
- Journal of Online Trust and Safety (2021-), Stanford University
- Journalism & Mass Communication Quarterly (1995-), SAGE Publications (formerly Journalism Bulletin (1924-1927), Journalism Quarterly 1928-1995).
- Mass Communication & Society (1998-), Taylor & Francis
- Media, Culture & Society (1979-), SAGE Publications
- Misinformation Review (2020-), Harvard Kennedy School
- New Media & Society (1999-), SAGE Publications
- Skeptic (1992-), The Skeptics Society
- Skeptical Inquirer (1976-), Committee for Skeptical Inquiry
- Social Media + Society (2015-), SAGE Publications

== Film and television ==
- The Power of Big Oil (2022), PBS Frontline documentary
- The Social Dilemma (2020), Netflix fiction
- After Truth: Disinformation and the Cost of Fake News (2020) HBO documentary
- America's Great Divide: From Obama to Trump (2020), PBS Frontline documentary
- Rachel Carson (January 24, 2017) PBS, American Experience documentary
- The Doubt Machine: Inside the Koch Brothers' War on Climate Science (2016), The Real News Network documentary
- Merchants of Doubt (2014), Sony Pictures Classics documentary
- Climate of Doubt (23 October 2012), PBS Frontline documentary
- Heat (21 October 2008), PBS Frontline documentary
- Fooling with Nature (June 2, 1998), PBS Frontline documentary about Rachel Carson's Silent Spring

== Countering disinformation ==
=== Print curricula ===
- The ABC Book of Media Literacy. Joensuu: News Media Finland & United Imaginations. 2024. (9th grade textbook)
- Bober, Tom (2022). Building News Literacy: Lessons for Teaching Critical Thinking Skills in Elementary and Middle Schools (1st ed.). London: Bloomsbury Libraries Unlimited. ISBN 978-1-4408-7515-1.
- Ireton, Cherilyn; Posetti, Julie (2018). Journalism, "fake news" & disinformation: handbook for journalism education and training (PDF). Paris: United Nations Educational, Scientific and Cultural Organization. ISBN 978-92-3-100281-6.
- Marwick, A.; Kuo, R.; Cameron, Shanice Jones; Weigel, Moira (2021). Critical Disinformation Studies: A Syllabus (PDF). Center for Information, Technology, & Public Life (CITAP), University of North Carolina at Chapel Hill.
- Framework for Information Literacy for Higher Education (PDF). Chicago, Illinois: Association of College and Research Libraries. January 11, 2016.
- Silverman, Craig, ed. (2013–2016). Verification Handbook (PDF). Maastricht, the Netherlands: The European Journalism Centre. (guidelines for journalists)

=== Online resources ===
==== Media literacy ====
While many people see media and data literacy as desirable for combating disinformation, they may not know where to find such training.

- Bergstrom, Carl T.; West, Jevin. "Calling Bullshit in the Age of Big Data". Youtube. University of Washington.
- Berkman, Robert. "Fighting Disinformation: A Six Part Series for New School Students". YouTube. School of Media Studies at the Schools of Public Engagement.
- Detmering, Robert; Willenborg, Amber; Holtze, Terri. "Citizen Literacy (online toolkit)". University of Louisville Libraries.
- Green, John. "Navigating Digital Information". Youtube. MediaWise.
- Yau, Nathan (13 February 2025). "Defense Against Dishonest Charts". FlowingData. (data literacy)
- "Check, Please! Starter Course". Notion.
- "Community of Online Research Assignments: an open access resource for faculty and librarians". CORA.
- "Curriculum and Lessons". SchoolJournalism.org, Reynolds High School Journalism Institute, University of Missouri.
- "Let's Get Started | Digital Resource Center | Stony Brook Center for News Literacy". Stony Brook University.
- "Media Literacy Resources". Media Literacy Clearinghouse.
- "News literacy classroom resources". News Literacy Project. (for all grades)
- "Resources – How to Spot Fake News". International Federation of Library Associations. March 16, 2020.
- Resources Archives, National Association for Media Literacy Education
- "Teaching Resources | Media Education Lab". Media Education Lab, University of Rhode Island Harrington School of Communication and Media.
- "Toolbox of Interventions Against Online Misinformation and Manipulation", Nature Human Behaviour
- First Draft's Essential Guides (guidelines for journalists)

==== Safety training for journalists and others ====
Attacks on journalists (including the use of disinformation to harass journalists and put them at increased risk) are increasing worldwide. Safety training is recommended to help people prepare for and respond to such threats.

- "How to report safely: Strategies for women journalists & their allies", Knight Center for Journalism in the Americas
- "Online Harassment Field Manual", PEN America
- "Promoting Journalist Safety"", Foley Foundation (journalist safety curricula)
- "Safety and resilience for journalists", National Council for the Training of Journalists
- "Safety Kit", Committee to Protect Journalists
- "Surveillance Self-Defense", Electronic Frontier Foundation
- "U.S. Journalism School Digital Security Curriculum", Freedom of the Press Foundation

==== Safety training for Wikipedia editors ====
The tactics that are used against journalists are also being used against Wikipedia editors. Disinformation attacks on Wikipedia itself attempt to undermine its credibility.

- Wikimedia Foundation Human Rights Team Publications
- Human Rights/Digital Security Resources, Meta Wiki
- Wikimedia Foundation Trust and Safety Resources, Meta Wiki

=== Games ===
- Bad News (video game)
- Cat Park
- Cranky Uncle
- Fake It To Make It
- Go Viral Game
- Harmony Square Game
- Troll Factory Game

== See also ==
- Disinformation attack
