= Disinformation research =

Academic research field

Disinformation research, also called disinformation studies or misinformation research, is an academic research field that aims to understand and counter disinformation, misinformation, and malinformation. The field provides a systemic framework and research methods for studying multiple interrelated phenomena of deceptive practices, like fake news and conspiracy theories, with particular attention to the online manipulation tools and tactics used to distort public perception with the intent to harm or profit.

This academic field should not be confused with the disinformation phenomenon, because disinformation research is a multidisciplinary academic project that is broader in scope, in that it includes multiple forms of media and Internet manipulation ranging from fake news websites to conspiracy theories on social media.

== Definitions ==
Disinformation research is a joint project by academics and policymakers aiming "to examine the causes and effects of various deceptions, from fake news to conspiracy theories, that permeate society, politics, and business. It also aims to develop countermeasures and policies that mitigate the spread of disinformation while protecting democratic freedoms", and thus "Disinformation research examines disinformation by focusing on its manifestations and designing counterstrategies. It also considers the demand side by exploring why disinformation circulates rapidly on social media and what factors make people vulnerable to consuming and believing it."

The Shorenstein Center defines disinformation research as an academic field that studies "the spread, impacts, and potential solutions to bad and misleading information in society," including "the causes of misinformation, how it spreads through online and offline channels, why people are susceptible to believing bad information, and successful strategies for mitigating its impact."

Research on this field provides evidence-based research on the impact of false or misleading information on society, it explores why people are susceptible to believe it, and explores counter strategies for mitigating its impact.

== Background ==
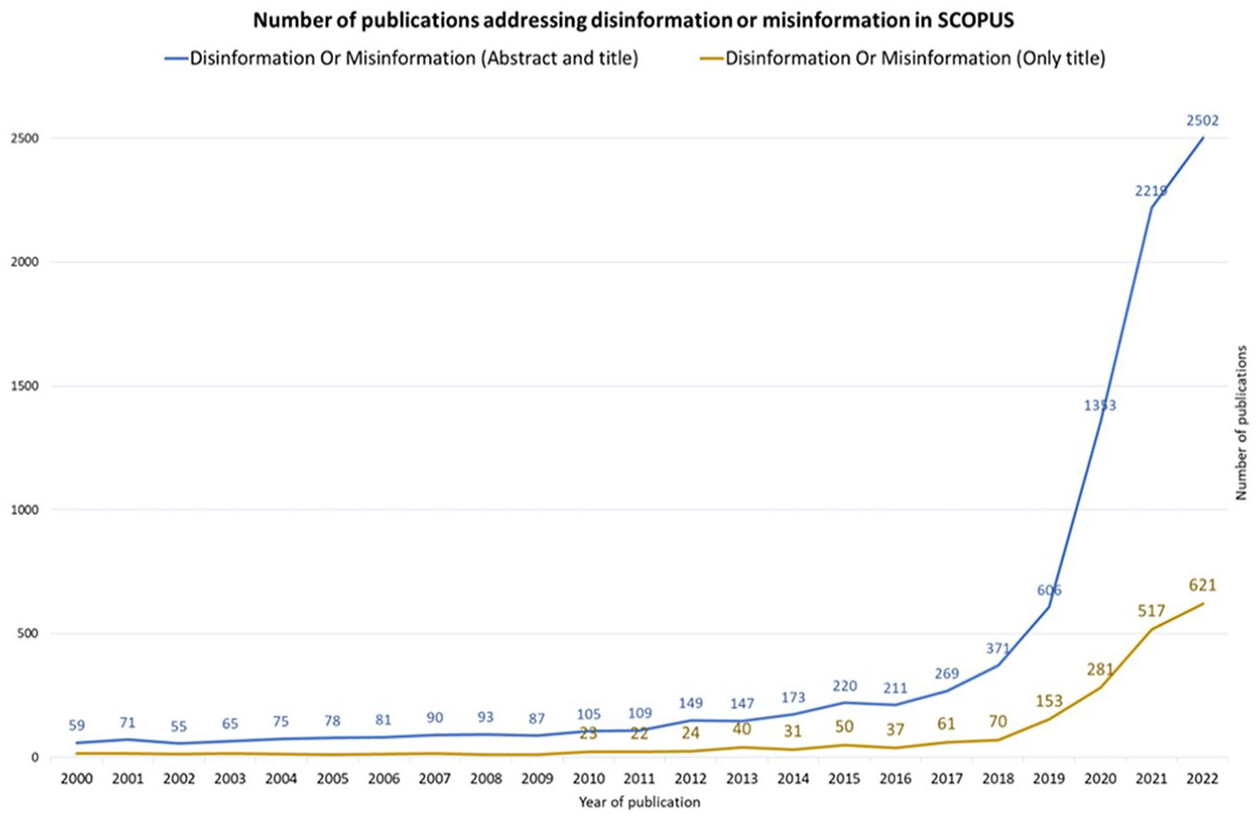
Bibliographic analysis of the rapid growth of disinformation research as an academic field

As an academic field, disinformation research examines the epistemology of knowledge, deception, and misleading information. The field is growing rapidly. A 2023 research paper published in New Media & Society shows that thousands of research papers has the words disinformation or misinformation on their titles or abstracts.

Disinformation has been a major scholarly and public area of concern since 2016 "spurred by a resurgence of white, right-wing nationalism exemplified by Brexit and Trump's presidential victory."

Between 2020 and 2022, the number within the field increased rapidly due to the emergence of COVID-19 misinformation, resulting from researcher's efforts to counter the overabundance of both real and false narratives.

On the other hand, the phenomenon refers to the distribution and amplification of misleading information for harm or profit. In an applied sense, researchers have evidence of the use of disinformation in military conflicts back to Classical Greece. The understanding of disinformation as a form of covert manipulation can be traced to the Soviet Union after World War II. From an information warfare perspective, disinformation is currently understood as a hybrid threat.

== Research fields ==
Multiple literature reviews have been conducted within disinformation research. Each review classifies the field in different ways.

A 2025 bibliographic review characterizes the field as multidisciplinary and draws six research clusters: Disinformation and health research, Disinformation research in digital technologies and cybersecurity, Disinformation in journalism and media research, Disinformation research in political communication and democratic governance, Disinformation in psychology and behavioral research, and Disinformation in business and advertising research.

=== Disinformation research in political communication and democratic governance ===
Disinformation in political communication refers to the deliberate use of deception to influence political outcomes. It studies the consequences of disinformation on society and trust on democratic institutions. It includes research into the state responses to hybrid security threats, including asymmetric informational warfare, such as the European Union's hybrid threats framework.

=== Disinformation in journalism and media research ===
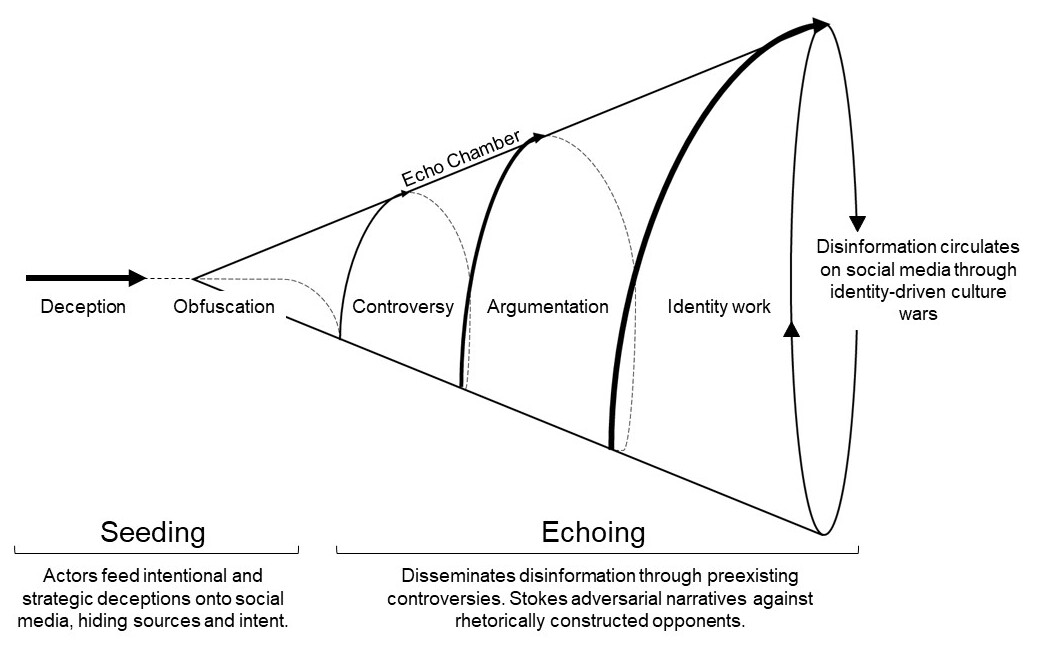
A Framework of how disinformation disseminates on social media through echo chambers

Disinformation in media studies examines the strategies used for media manipulation. In journalism, disinformation research focuses on fake news and its correction via fact checking and media literacy. This field also studies how social media amplifies society's polarization.

=== Disinformation research in digital technologies and cybersecurity. ===
Researchers have explored the growing use of advanced digital technologies for internet manipulation. Specifically, researchers study the growing use of bots to manipulate social media platforms, a phenomenon called coordinated inauthentic behavior. The purposes of this stream include the detection of disinformation at scale, the measurement of impact, the data infrastructures required to study disinformation online without compromising user privacy or data integrity, and ethical guidelines for conducting disinformation research without harm.

=== Disinformation in business and advertising research ===
Market-oriented disinformation research is "a research field that investigates the circulation of disinformation—along with its multiple manifestations like fake news and conspiracy theories—from a business perspective addressing the market practices that render it profitable." It also includes research on the overlap between the mechanisms used to commit ad fraud and the revenue that funds fake news websites. This stream includes disinformation spread and amplified by influencers for profit.

=== Disinformation in psychology and behavioral research ===
A sub field of psychology that examines the cognitive processes that influence why people believe and share misinformation. Key factors include cognitive biases with which individuals favor information that fits with their pre-existing beliefs.

== Research centers ==
Several universities and think tanks maintain research centers partially or entirely dedicated to disinformation research.

In Europe, research centers studying disinformation are networks of experts, for example the European Digital Media Observatory (EDMO), describes itself as "the EU's largest interdisciplinary network to counter disinformation." Another example is the EU DisinfoLab (EUDL), " an independent non-profit organisation, which gathers knowledge and expertise on disinformation in Europe." Chatham House, a British think tank, lists disinformation as one of their topics of expertise. Some European universities maintain dedicated research centers; in Finland, LUT University hosts one.

In the United States, some examples include the Shorenstein Center at Harvard, which describes its purpose as "Addressing the spread, impacts, and potential solutions to bad and misleading information in society." and the Standford Internet Observatory.

== Academic journals ==
According to a library guide maintained by the European Commission, the following scholarly journals publish credible disinformation research:

- International Journal of Intelligence and Counterintelligence
- Journalism & Mass Communication Quarterly
- Journal of Communication
- Journal of Democracy
- Mass Communication & Society
- Media, Culture & Society
- Misinformation Review
- New Media & Society
- Social Media + Society

There are several other publications about disinformation, which includes books and other specialized journals. A 2022 bibliographic review identified other journals, based on quantity.

- Applied Cognitive Psychology
- PLOS One
- Journal of Medical Internet Research

Other scholarly journals publishing disinformation research include

- Journal of Public Policy & Marketing
- Harvard Kennedy School Misinformation Review

== Politicisation of disinformation research in the US ==
Since 2023, Republican members of the US Congress have attacked researchers who study disinformation as being against freedom of speech and as a euphemism for government censorship.

On April 18, 2025, citing an Executive Order signed by Trump, the US National Science Foundation released a statement cancelling funding for disinformation research. The note explains that disinformation does not fit with the NSF priorities, "including but not limited to those on diversity, equity, and inclusion (DEI) and misinformation/disinformation."

== See also ==
- Disinformation
- Disinformation attack
- Misinformation
- Publications about disinformation
