= Disinformation (disambiguation) =

Disinformation is the deliberate dissemination of false information. A Disinformation attack may involve specific types of tactics and goals, which can be countered. Disinformation may also refer to:

- Disinformation (album), a 1999 album by Tin Huey
- Disinformation (TV series), a Channel 4 television series
- Disinformation (company), an American publishing company
- Disinformation (book), a 2013 book by Ronald Rychlak and Ion Mihai Pacepa
- Dezinformatsia (book), a 1984 book by Richard H. Shultz and Roy Godson
- Disinformation (Sinplus album), 2012

== See also ==
- Misinformation
- Disinformation attack
- Disinformation research
