= Sust-it =

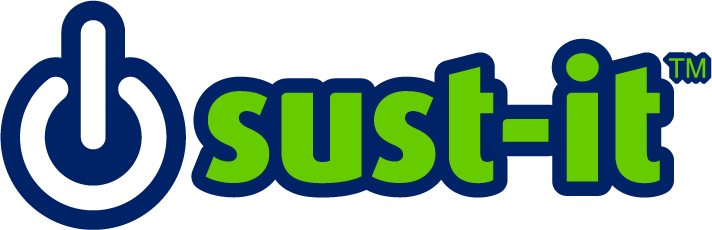
- Website type: Consumer advice and action, price comparison
- Available in: English
- Headquarters: Gloucestershire
- Founder: Ross Lammas
- Industry: Energy efficiency
- Website: http://www.sust-it.net
- Launched: 2007

Sust-it is the UK's first energy efficiency website for electrical appliances and products. It ranks products by their running costs and CO_{2} emissions based on average usage, and presents this information in financial terms. It has researched over 11,000 household electrical products from TV's to washing machines. Sust-it featured on The Independent's 101 Really Useful Websites. and products. In 2008 Sust-it was shortlisted in the Green Awards for Creativity in sustainability, and in 2009 received highly commended in the UK CEED eWell-Being Awards.

Their research has been used to highlight energy efficiency improvements in televisions between 2006 and 2011. Sust-it data has been used by the International Energy Agency as part of their studies on Efficient Electrical End-Use Equipment.

== Background ==
Sust-it was launched in January 2007, after being conceived and created by multimedia producer Ross Lammas. It came about after he built an ecohouse and discovered how difficult it was to access meaningful information on the energy consumption of household electrical products. The potential CO_{2} savings from energy efficient appliances had been well documented. EU Energy labeling and Eco-design of Energy-related products has helped raise the energy efficiency of household electrical goods.

== Data sources ==
Sust-it researches information on energy consumption from manufacturers published data and makes calculations based on average domestic UK energy prices. Annual kgCO2 is calculated using the National Energy Foundation formula for UK mains electricity. In 2011 Sust-it added water usage costs to relevant appliances, using the Ofwat UK average cost of 0.12p/litre. Computer and printer data is based on Energy Star's TEC testing and calculation.

== Business Model ==
Sust-it is financed by advertisers, who pay on a pay per click, or by commissions on sales, revenues are also generated by providing energy consumption data for researchers and retailers. They do not receive any funding from any Government agencies, trusts or independent charities.
