= Anna Reading =

British author and academic

Professor Anna Reading PhD
- Citizenship: United Kingdom
- Education: University of York
- Occupations: Author; Playwright; Academic
- Employer: King's College London
- Notable work: Autistic Dreaming; Gender and Memory in the Globital Age; Save As...Digital Memories; The Social Inheritance of the Holocaust, Gender Culture and Memory; Polish Women, Solidarity and Feminism
- Website: Official website

Anna Reading (born 1965) is a British author, playwright and academic specialising in gender and cultural memory studies.

== Education and early life ==
Reading was born in the Midlands, UK and was educated at a comprehensive school in Camberley, Surrey. She gained a first in English literature and Politics, and an MA in Women's Studies from the University of York. During her studies, Reading co-founded a rape crisis group in York . She was a peace protestor at Greenham Common women's peace camp in the 1980s. Post-graduation she lectured in English literature and language at Poland's University of Łódź for one year. She wrote plays and journalism before working as a researcher on East European media change. Reading completed her PhD thesis, Socially inherited memory, gender and the public sphere in Poland, at the University of Westminster School of Media, Arts and Design in 1996.

== Career ==
=== Academic ===
Reading is professor of culture and creative industries at King's College London. She teaches and researches gender and cultural memory with an intersectional feminist approach. She was Head of King's Department of Culture, Media and Creative Industries 2013-17 and Director of King's Arts and Humanities Research Institute 2018-22. She held senior academic positions at London South Bank University and Western Sydney University, Sydney, Australia. She is professorial research associate at the University of Glasgow. She is joint managing editor of the journal Media, Culture and Society.

Reading's scholarly publications are cited by scholars in comparative literature, gender studies, holocaust studies, heritage studies, memory studies, and media studies, with growing interest within environmental studies and disability studies. In an interview with The Guardian she analyses the significance of citizen journalism and the camera phone in the witnessing of the 2005 London Bombings. She reflects on singing and women's activism research for the BBC's Choral History of Britain. In an interview with ABC Reading explains how digital technologies and globally networked memory or 'globital memory' is changing human responses to death and grief.

=== Theatre ===
Reading co-founded the feminist collective Strip Search Theatre in 1987, writing and directing plays that expose injustice and inequalities. Her plays are part of the British drama movement 'In yer face theatre'. Christina Ward suggests that Reading's plays fall within Anglophone 'trauma drama'. Anne Rüggemeier notes, however, that Reading's plays and productions operate at multiple levels with 'the collective transformation of symbolic, spiritual and emotional capital between the cast and audience' with theatre contributing to a 'restitutional assemblage'.

==== Kiss Punch Goodnight ====
Reading's Kiss Punch Goodnight was performed by Strip Search Theatre in 1987. The play, which tells the story of an incest survivor, is described by Mary Remnant in Methuen's Plays for Women as 'Explicit, harrowing and shocking' adding 'the play pulls no punches in its premise that power and not love or sexual desire underlies child sexual abuse.' Kiss Punch Goodnight previewed in York before appearing at the Edinburgh Fringe Festival. The Scotsman notes, 'The horror of the atrocities against childhood in this innocent-looking prison emerge cogently and movingly into their awful legacy in the adult woman. Despite that this is not male-battering play but a positive and illuminating exploration of dark corner.'

Want

During the East European revolutions of 1989 and inspired by feminism in Poland Reading wrote Want, drawing on life-histories she conducted with Polish women. Strip Search Theatre performed Want in six Polish cities and six cities in the UK and Ireland. Want dramatises Polish women's history and revolutionary struggles as they wait for rationed food, splicing naturalism with surrealist techniques and distancing effects.

Hard Core

In 1990 Reading's Hard Core, commissioned by Cardiff's WOT Theatre and directed by Jeremy James, was produced at the Sherman Theatre, Cardiff and in London. In the Western Mail Reading said the play was a response to an interview she conducted with a shop owner who sold firearms and pornography together. The play is set during the fall of the Roman Empire and explores totalitarianism, class and sexual decadence.

Grandmas Garden and The Stoning

In 1991 Reading wrote Grandma's Garden and The Stoning. The idea for The Stoning springs from a news report of a woman who during her trial superglued her lips together. Set in an open prison, The Stoning explores poverty, crime, and incarceration. Its sister play, Grandma's Garden, is a fairytale set in the 'unfenced mind' of Beatie, 71, who runs away from an abusive care home with her lover Lottie. Strip Search Theatre toured the UK with performances at York Arts Centre and at London's Ovalhouse.

Falling

Falling dramatises the story of a runaway mixed-race fifteen-year-old girl, Ket, who is groomed by an older white man. Ket escapes to discover sanctuary and resilience with her Caribbean grandmother. The play was performed in 1996 at the Bird's Nest, London. Theatre critic Aleks Sierz describes Falling as capturing 'unbearable pain' summed up in the image of Ket 'trying to remove a tampon after she is raped.' Siertz states that Falling iillustrates how the 1990s shift by British playwrights to shock audiences with 'distressing truths' was found across the UK theatre landscape not only the stages of Edinburgh's Traverse Theatre and London's Royal Court.

To My Dearest Daughter

Fuel Theatre commissioned Reading's To my dearest daughter for Phenomenal People. A digital theatre event celebrating women's lives, it was first performed at the UK's Calm Down, Dear festival. The play is a monologue in the form of a mother's letter to her seven year old daughter. It was also part of King's 2015 festival Fabrication with the script published in Gender and Memory in the Globital Age.

Filmmaker and writer Vincent O'Connell directed a reading of RP35, about a sculptor's obsessive collecting, at Southwark Theatre. O'Connell later directed a rehearsed reading of Cacti Hearts the first part of a trilogy 'Pre-Occupations' set in the Middle East, at London's Edric Theatre, also performed in Tromso, Norway. InThe Unkind, inspired by Nikolaus Geyrhater' s film Homo Sapiens, Reading writes dialogue in a future language beyond climate change, drone warfare and fascism. The Unkind was performed at London's Oval House Theatre as part of a International Women's Day celebration.

BOOKS

==== Polish Women, Solidarity and Feminism ====
Reading's Polish Women Solidarity and Feminism examines the impact on women's lives of the revolutions in Eastern Europe.The book analyses how sexism in Polish culture is constructed in language, history, memory and social policies by the communist state and in the Polish trade uniion movement Solidarity. The book provides a detailed account of Polish feminist history and emergent feminist groups after 1989, providing a sense of hope. Peggy Watson argues that the book's interviews with Polish women 'puncture the systematic silence which has existed around gender issues'.

==== The Social Inheritance of the Holocaust: Gender Culture and Memory ====
Reading's The Social Inheritance of the Holocaust challenges Geoffrey Hartman's assumption that the Nazi Holocaust was gender-neutral. Reading argues that 'both the event itself and its subsequent memory are gendered.' Focussing on Jewish and Romani Holocaust victims and survivors, Reading shows how the Holocaust's intersectional gendered impacts are culturally articulated and remembered by young people in Poland, the UK and US from Holocaust historiography, at sites of genocidal atrocity, in museums, autobiographies and films. Reading argues that including an understanding of gender enables a more complex understanding of the path to genocide and to understanding how memories of the holocaust are handed down.

==== Save As...Digital Memories ====
Save As...Digital Memories develops the concept of digital memory and examines how digital technologies are changing how people remember and mediate history and memory. Case studies explore mnemonic practices related to online memorials, blogs, social networking sites, digital archives and virtual museums with foci on the war on terror, cyberpunk, and the Holocaust. Reading's contribution examines the ways in which mobile phones are changing human memory forms and practices.

Cultural Memories of Nonviolent Struggles

The book examines cultural memories of peace and non-violent struggles through movements that include Mahatma Gandhi's Salt March, the Suffragette movement, Poland's Solidarity, Aboriginal people's cultural restitution, The Second Intifada, anti-war museums and independent video games. Reading examines singing and the reworking of peace songs at Greenham Common. A review by Rachel Julian argues that the book demonstrates the importance of cultural memory for future non-violent success.

==== Gender and Memory in the Globital Age ====
The book examines how digital and connective media technologies and globalisation combine unevenly to form new kinds of gendered memory assemblages and trajectories. Reading contends that from before birth, through natal imaging, until after death, through digital memorials, human lives are now mnemonically configured in the 'globital memory' field. The book influenced a reorientation in memory studies towards digital technologies and digital memory.

The Right to Memory

The Right to Memory explores the arguments for a 'just memory culture': In an interview, Reading said individuals and communities have the right to make public stories about the past 'in their own way'. She develops a typology of memory rights already found in international laws, including legal protections for indigenous peoples. In the face of extinction events and climate change Reading makes the case for integrating non-human and more-than-human memory rights.

Autistic Dreaming

Autistic Dreaming demonstrates how autistic people's cultural activism 'functions as a crucial repository for embodied knowledge'. The book draws on critical disability studies and neuroqueer theory to neuroqueer to memory studies. The research examines speaking and non-speaking autistic people's life writing, websites, films and art work from around the world. The book highlights particular 'characteristics of autistic memory such as heightened sensory experiences, deep ecological connection and interactions with objects, environments and energies'.

== Publications ==
=== Books ===
Author(s)	Year	Title	Location	Publisher
Reading, Anna	2025	Autistic Dreaming: Vibrant Memory, Activism and Environment	New York	Berghahn
Tirosh, Noam and Reading, Anna (eds)	2023	A Right to Memory: History, Media, Law, Ethics	New York	Berghahn
Reading, Anna	2016	Gender and Memory in the Globital Age	London	Palgrave Macmillan
Reading, Anna and Katriel, Tamar (eds)	2015	Cultural Memories of Nonviolent Struggle: Powerful Times	London	Palgrave Macmillan
Garde-Hansen, Joanne, Hoskins, Andrew and Reading, Anna (eds)	2009	Save As...Digital Memories	London	Palgrave Macmillan
Reading, Anna	2002	The Social Inheritance of the Holocaust: Gender, Culture and Memory	London	Palgrave Macmillan
Stokes, Jane and Reading, Anna (eds)	1999	Media in Britain: Current Debates and Developments	London	Macmillan
Sparks, Colin with Anna Reading	1998	Communism, Capitalism and the Mass Media	London	Sage
Reading, Anna	1992	Polish Women, Solidarity and Feminism	London	Macmillan

=== Plays ===
- Kiss Punch Goodnight (1987)
- Want (1990)
- Hard Core (1990)
- Grandma's Garden (1991)
- The Stoning (1991)
- Falling (1996)
- RP35 (2004)
- Cacti Hearts (2009)
- Letter to My Daughter (2014)
- The Unkind (2022)
