= Douglas London =

American former CIA officer and author

- Education: Manhattanville College
- Occupations: Intelligence officer, author, lecturer
- Employer(s): Central Intelligence Agency (until 2019); Georgetown University
- Notable work: The Recruiter (2021)

Douglas London is an American former Central Intelligence Agency (CIA) operations officer and author. He worked for the CIA for 34 years and retired in 2019. From 2016 to 2018 he was the agency's chief for counterterrorism in South and Southwest Asia. He wrote the memoir The Recruiter: Spying and the Lost Art of American Intelligence (2021) and teaches at Georgetown University.

== Early life ==
London attended Manhattanville College, where the CIA first identified him as a candidate. He served as an enlisted Marine before he joined the agency in the 1980s.

== CIA career ==
London spent 34 years in the CIA's Clandestine Service and worked in the Middle East, South Asia, Central Asia and Africa. From 2016 to 2018 he was the CIA's chief for counterterrorism in South and Southwest Asia, a post in which he oversaw operations and intelligence in Afghanistan. He retired in 2019. According to him, he held three assignments as a chief of station and, as regional counterterrorism chief, he was responsible for the assessments on Afghanistan prepared for President Donald Trump.

== Later career ==
London is an adjunct associate professor at the Center for Security Studies of Georgetown University's Walsh School of Foreign Service and a non-resident fellow at the Middle East Institute.

== The Recruiter ==
Hachette Books published London's memoir, The Recruiter: Spying and the Lost Art of American Intelligence, on September 28, 2021. The book describes his recruitment and training and his work as a case officer who recruited foreign agents. It argues that after the September 11 attacks the CIA turned from human intelligence to counterterrorism and paramilitary operations, and that it should return to espionage. London criticizes the reorganization of the agency under director John Brennan and is also critical of a later director, Gina Haspel. Because of the conditions set by CIA classification reviewers, the book uses mostly pseudonyms and omits precise locations and dates.

Robert Dannenberg wrote in The Cipher Brief that the book was strongest on field tradecraft and weakest in its criticism of the changes in the agency's mission after 2001. He also wrote that it revealed "far too much operational tradecraft". Joseph Wippl, also a former CIA officer, reviewed the book in the International Journal of Intelligence and CounterIntelligence.

== Commentary on Afghanistan ==
In July 2021 London told NPR that after 2001 CIA officers who favored covert action and paramilitary operations had risen faster than intelligence collectors and had come to shape the agency.

After the Taliban took Kabul in August 2021, London wrote in Just Security that the CIA had anticipated a rapid collapse of the Afghan government as a possible scenario. He called President Biden's statement that events had unfolded more quickly than anticipated "misleading at best". In an interview with Peter Bergen published by CNN the same month, he said that the collapse could have been prevented if a force of about 5,000 American troops had remained in the country.

== Works ==
- The Recruiter: Spying and the Lost Art of American Intelligence. Hachette Books, 2021. ISBN 978-0-306-84730-1.
