= Garnham =

Garnham is a surname. Notable people with the surname include:

- Cyril Garnham (1901–1994), British parasitologist
- Mike Garnham (born 1960), English cricketer
- Nicholas Garnham (born 1937), media studies academic
- Robin Garnham (born 1988), British handball player
- Scott Garnham (born 1985), British actor and singer
