= Media, Culture & Society =

- Discipline: Media studies
- Language: English
- Edited by: Raymond Boyle, Anna Reading,

Publication details
- History: 1979-present
- Publisher: SAGE Publications
- Frequency: 8/year
- Impact factor: 3.3 (2025)

Standard abbreviations
- ISO 4: Media Cult. Soc.

Indexing
- ISSN: 0163-4437 (print); 1460-3675 (web)
- LCCN: 84644179
- OCLC no.: 38525833

Links
- Journal homepage; Online access; Online archive

Media, Culture & Society is a peer-reviewed academic journal published eight times a year that examines the relationships between media, culture and society. The editors-in-chief are Raymond Boyle, (University of Glasgow) and Anna Reading (King's College London). Editors include Emily Keightley (Loughborough University) Simone Natale (University of Turin) and Aswin Punathambekar (University of Pennsylvania). The assistant editors are Julia Giese (University of Derby) and Devina Sarwatay (City St Georges).

Previous editors were John Corner (University of Leeds), Nicolas Garnham (University of Westminster) Paddy Scannell (University of Michigan), Philip Schlesinger (University of Glasgow), Colin Sparks (University of Westminster ). The journal established in 1979 is published by SAGE Publications.

== Abstracting and indexing ==
The journal is abstracted and indexed in Scopus and the Social Sciences Citation Index. According to Journal Metrics the impact factor is 3.3 in 2025 with a 5 year impact factor of 4.0.
