= Faktabaari =

Finnish fact-checking organization

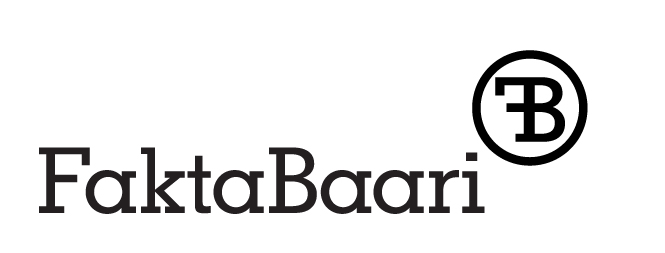
Faktabaari logo

Faktabaari is a Finnish fact-checking and digital information literacy service. Since 2014, it has contributed to fact-based information circulation in Finland with projects and fact-checks, with a particular focus on national and European Parliamentary election debates.

Faktabaari adheres to the Finnish ethical code for journalists and has subscribed to the Code of Standards of the European Fact-Checking Standards Network. Faktabaari is a member of the International Fact-Checking Network IFCSN and the NORDIS hub of European Digital Media Observatory EDMO.

Faktabaari has been awarded Europcom award, the Bonnier Grand Journalism Prize and two Chydenius medals (2018 and again 2021 with EDMO NORDIS).

== Activities ==
Faktabaari does regular fact-checks. For example, in 2024 it did a thorough check on claims of Smolensk air disaster by the Finnish journalist Jessikka Aro. Aro claimed that the 2010 air disaster was caused by a Russian bomb attack, which was covered up by the Polish Government. Faktabaari's fact-check showed that two accident investigations carried out in Poland and research by a US aviation laboratory demonstrate that the plane transporting the president of Poland and senior military officers was destroyed upon impact with trees and not as the result of an explosion.

Faktabaari has also focused on biases in algorithms of social media giants. In 2024 Faktabaari and CheckFirst showed that TikTok's search suggestions contained toxic language towards women and minorities in Finland and that YouTube's algorithm promoted right-wing content in the 2024 Finnish elections.

In its media literacy activities, Faktabaari has produced for example popular voter literacy kits for schools and the wider public. These include exercises examining claims found in YouTube videos and social media posts, comparing media bias in an array of different "clickbait" articles, probing how misinformation preys on readers' emotions, and getting students to try their hand at writing fake news stories themselves.
