= Tamar Katriel =

Tamar Katriel (Hebrew: תמר כתריאל; born 1947) is professor emeritus of communications in the University of Haifa.

Her interests include, among others, culture, language and communication, in particular, issues of language and memory in the context of the cultural legacy of German-speaking Jews in Israel.

Tamar Katriel was born and educated in Israel. She earned BA in English language and literature (University of Haifa, Ben Gurion University, 1967-1973); MA in English linguistics (UoH, 1973-1976); MA in speech communication (UoH, 1979-1980). She received a PhD in speech communication at University of Washington in Seattle in 1983 and since then she was with the University of Haifa.

== Books ==
- 1986: Talking Straight: Dugri Speech in Israeli Sabra Culture
  Analysis of the cultural phenomenon of 'dugri', or "straight" speech style of sabras; based on her Ph.D.
- 1991: Communal Webs: Communication and Culture in Contemporary Israel
- 2004: Dialogic Moments: From Soul Talks to Talk Radio in Israeli Culture
- 2013: Performing the Past: A Study of Israeli Settlement Museums
- 2020: Defiant Discourse: Speech and Action in Grassroots Activism (The Politics of Language)

== Awards and recognition ==
- 1987: Golden Anniversary Award for Outstanding Scholarship for Talking Straight from the American National Communication Association
- 2004 University of Washington Alumni Hall of Fame
- 2017: Elected Fellow of the International Communication Association
- 2023: Life Achievement Award from the Israeli Anthropological Association
