= Journal of Public Policy & Marketing =

- Discipline: Marketing
- Language: English
- Edited by: Kelly D. Martin and Maura L. Scott

Publication details
- Former names: Journal of Marketing & Public Policy; Public Policy Issues in Marketing
- History: 1979–present
- Publisher: American Marketing Association (United States)
- Frequency: Quarterly
- Impact factor: 5.1 (2023)

Standard abbreviations
- ISO 4: J. Public Policy Mark.

Indexing
- Journal of Public Policy & Marketing
- ISSN: 0743-9156 (print); 1547-7207 (web)
- LCCN: 84643643
- JSTOR: jpublpolimark
- OCLC no.: 10339729
- Journal of Marketing & Public Policy
- ISSN: 0748-6766
- JSTOR: jmarkpublpoli
- LCCN: 84649780
- OCLC no.: 8713710
- Public Policy Issues in Marketing
- ISSN: 2328-8469
- LCCN: 80649443
- OCLC no.: 6801744

Links
- Journal homepage; Online access; Online archive

Journal of Public Policy & Marketing is a quarterly peer-reviewed academic journal published by SAGE on behalf of the American Marketing Association. It covers all aspects of the intersection of marketing and public policy. It was originally established in 1979 as Public Policy Issues in Marketing, and renamed itself to Journal of Marketing & Public Policy 1982 for one year, before settling on the current name in 1983.

== Abstracting and indexing ==
The journal is indexed and abstracted in the following bibliographic databases:

- ABI/INFORM
- Business Source Elite
- Business Source Premier
- Communication & Mass Media Index
- PAIS International
- Periodicals Index Online
- Psycinfo
- Public Affairs Index
- Scopus
- Social Sciences Citation Index

According to the Journal Citation Reports, the journal has a 2023 impact factor of 5.1.

== Awards ==
Since 1993, the journal annual awards the Thomas C. Kinnear award to recognize the article that makes "the most significant contribution to the understanding of marketing and public policy issues". The article must have been published in the journal within the most recent three-year period.

Year	Authors	Title	Locator
2025	Carlos Diaz Ruiz and Tomas Nilsson	"Disinformation and Echo Chambers: How Disinformation Circulates on Social Media through Identity-Driven Controversies"	Vol. 42, No. 1 (January 2023)
2024	Eva Kipnis, Catherine Demangeot, Chris Pullig, Samantha N.N. Cross, Charles Chi Cui, Cristina Galalae, Shauna Kearney, Tana Cristina Licsandru, Carlo Mari, Verónica Martín Ruiz, Samantha Swanepoel, Lizette Vorster, and Jerome D. Williams	“Institutionalizing Diversity-and-Inclusion-Engaged Marketing for Multicultural Marketplace Well-Being”	Vol. 40, No. 2 (April 2021)
2023	Sonja Martin Poole, Sonya A. Grier, Kevin D. Thomas, Francesca Sobande, Akon E. Ekpo, Lez Trujillo Torres, Lynn A. Addington, Melinda Weekes-Laidlow, and Geraldine Rosa Henderson	“Operationalizing Critical Race Theory in the Marketplace”	Vol. 40, No. 2 (April 2021)
2022	Melissa G. Bublitz, Jonathan Hansen, Laura A. Peracchio, and Sherrie Tussler	“Hunger and Food Well-Being: Advancing Research and Practice”	Vol. 38, No. 2 (April 2019)
2021	Sonya A. Grier and Vanessa G. Perry	“Dog Parks and Coffee Shops: Faux Diversity and Consumption in Gentrifying Neighborhoods”	Vol. 37, No. 1 (May 2018)
2020	Lauren G. Block, Punam A. Keller, Beth Vallen, Sara Williamson, Mia M. Birau, Amir Grinstein, Kelly L. Haws, Monica C. LaBarge, Cait Lamberton, Elizabeth S. Moore, Emily M. Moscato, Rebecca Walker Reczek, and Andrea Heintz Tangari	“The Squander Sequence: Understanding Food Waste at Each Stage of the Consumer Decision-Making Process”	Vol. 35, No. 2 (Fall 2016)
2019	Shalini Bahl, George R. Milne, Spencer M. Ross, David Glen Mick, Sonya A. Grier, Sunaina K. Chugani, Steven S. Chan, Stephen Gould, Yoon-Na Cho, Joshua D. Dorsey, Robert M. Schindler, Mitchel R. Murdock, and Sabine Boesen-Mariani	“Mindfulness: Its Transformative Potential for Consumer, Societal, and Environmental Well-Being”	Vol. 35, No. 2 (Fall 2016)
2018	Kristen Walker	“Through the Looking Glass: Transparency, Trust, and Protection”	Vol. 35, No. 1 (Spring 2016)
2017	Sonya Grier and Brennan Davis	“Are All Proximity Effects Created Equal? Fast Food Near Schools and Body Weight Among Diverse Adolescents”	Vol. 32, No. 1 (Spring 2013)
2016	Ronald Paul Hill and Kelly D. Martin	“Broadening the Paradigm of Marketingas Exchange: A Public Policy and Marketing Perspective”	Vol. 33, No. 1 (Spring 2014)
2015	Linda Scott, Jerome D. Williams, Stacey Menzel Baker, Jan Brace-Govan, Hilary Downey, Anne-Marie Hakstian, Geraldine Rosa Henderson, Peggy Sue Loroz, and Dave Webb	“Beyond Poverty: Social Justice in a Global Marketplace”	Vol. 30, No. 1, Spring 2011
2014	Lauren G. Block, Sonya A. Grier, Terry L. Childers, Brennan Davis, Jane E.J. Ebert, Shiriki Kumanyika, Russell N. Laczniak, Jane E. Machin, Carol M. Motley, Laura Peracchio, Simone Pettigrew, Maura Scott, and Mirjam N.G. van Ginkel Bieshaar	“From Nutrients to Nurturance: A Conceptual Introduction to Food Well-Being”	Vol. 30, No. 1, Spring 2011
2013	J. Craig Andrews, Richard G. Netemeyer, and Scot Burton	“The Nutrition Elite: Do Only the Highest Levels of Caloric Knowledge, Obesity Knowledge, and Motivation Matter in Processing Nutrition Ad Claims and Disclosures?”	Vol. 28, No. 1, Spring 2009
2012	Jeremy Kees, Scot Burton, J. Craig Andrews, and John Kozup	“Understanding How Graphic Pictorial Warnings Work on Cigarette Packaging”	Vol. 29, No. 2, Fall 2010
2011	Madhubalan Viswanathan, Manoj Hastak, and Roland Gau	Understanding and Facilitating the Usage of Nutritional Labels by Low-Literate Consumers”	Vol. 28, No. 2, Fall 2009
2010	Elizabeth S. Moore and Victoria J. Rideout	“The Online Marketing of Food to Children: Is It Just Fun and Games?”	Vol. 26, No. 2, Fall 2007
2009	Marvin Goldberg and Kunter Gunasti	“Creating an Environment in Which YouthsAre Encouraged to Eata Healthier Diet”	Vol. 26, No. 2, Fall 2007
2008	Marvin Goldberg, Keith E. Niedermeier, LoriJ. Bechtel, and Gerald J. Gorn	“Heightening Adolescent Vigilance Toward Alcohol Advertising to Forestall Alcohol Use”	Vol. 25, No. 2, Fall 2006
2007	Gary T. Ford	“Obesity and the Roleof Food Marketing: APolicy Analysis of Issues and Remedies”	Vol. 23, No. 2, Fall 2004
2005	William L. Wilkie and Elizabeth S. Moore	“Scholarly Research in Marketing: Exploring the ‘4 Eras’ of Thought Development”	Vol. 22, No. 2, Fall 2003
2004	Janis Kohanski Pappalardo and Debra Jones Ringold	“Regulating Commercial Speech in a Dynamic Environment: Forty Years of Margarine and Oil Advertising Before the NLEA”	Vol. 19, No. 1, Spring 2000
2003	Manoj Hastak, Michael B. Mazis, and Louis A. Morris	“The Role of Consumer Surveys in Public Policy Decision Making”	Vol. 20, No. 2, Fall 2001
2002	Brian Roe, Alan S. Levy, and Brenda M. Derby	“The Impact of Health Claims on Consumer Search and Product Evaluation Outcomes: Results from FDA Experimental Data”	Vol. 18, No. 1, Spring 1999
2001	Clifford J. Shultz II and Morris B. Holbrook	“Marketing and the Tragedy of the Commons: A Synthesis, Commentary, and Analysis for Action”	Vol. 18, No. 2, Fall 1999
2000	Avery M. Abernethy and George R. Franke	“FTC Regulatory Activity and the Information Content of Advertising”	Vol. 17, No. 2, Fall 1998
1999	Brian T. Ratchford, Jagdish Agrawal, Pamela E. Grimm, and Narasimhan Srinivasan	“Toward Understanding the Measurement of Market Efficiency”	Vol. 15, No. 2, Fall 1996
1998	Christine Moorman	“A Quasi Experiment to Assess the Consumer and Informational Determinants of Nutrition Information Processing Activities: The Case of theNutrition Labeling and Education Act”	Vol. 15, No. 1, Spring 1996
1997	Itamar Simonson	“Trademark Infringement From the Buyer Perspective: Conceptual Analysis and Measurement Implications”	Vol. 13, No. 2, Fall 1994
1996	David W. Stewart and Ingrid M. Martin	“Intended and Unintended Consequences of Warning Messages: A Review and Synthesis of Empirical Research”	Vol. 13, No. 1, Spring 1994
1995	John E. Calfee and Janis K. Pappalardo	“Public Policy Issues in Health Claims for Foods”	Vol. 10, No. 1, Spring 1991
1994	Paul N. Bloom	“A Decision Model for Prioritizing and Addressing Consumer Information Problems”	Vol. 8, 1989
1993	William L. Wilkie	“Affirmative Disclosure at the FTC: Objectives for the Remedy and Outcomes of Past Orders”	Vol. 5, 1986

== Notable papers ==
According to the Scopus database in 2024, the two most cited papers in are "Interventions to break and create consumer habits" and "Privacy concerns and consumer willingness to provide personal information."
