= Applied Cognitive Psychology =

Academic journal

- Discipline: Cognitive psychology
- Language: English
- Edited by: Michael E. Lamb

Publication details
- History: 1987–present
- Publisher: John Wiley & Sons
- Frequency: Bimonthly
- Impact factor: 1.80 (2024)

Standard abbreviations
- ISO 4: Appl. Cogn. Psychol.

Indexing
- CODEN: JACPEO
- ISSN: 0888-4080 (print); 1099-0720 (web)
- LCCN: 87641533
- OCLC no.: 909876244

Links
- Journal homepage; Online access; Online archive

Applied Cognitive Psychology is a bimonthly peer-reviewed scientific journal covering experimental research in cognitive psychology. It was established in 1987 and is published by John Wiley & Sons. The founding editors-in-chief were Douglas Herrmann and Graham M. Davies, and the current editor-in-chief is Michael E. Lamb (University of Cambridge). According to the Journal Citation Reports, the journal has a 2024 impact factor of 1.80, ranking it 56th out of 102 journals in the category "Psychology, Experimental".
