= Nicholas Garnham =

British academic (born 1937)

Nicholas Garnham (born 1937) is Emeritus Professor at the University of Westminster in the academic field of Media Studies.

== Education and naval service ==
Garnham attended Winchester College from 1950 to 1955 where the major influence on his thinking was British socialist historian R. H. Tawney. His main interests were British history, architecture and cinema, the last of which has remained a lifelong passion and research focus. Garnham served in the Royal Navy from 1956 to 1958. He was in one of the last drafts to the service under compulsory conscription. He studied briefly at the Sorbonne in Paris in 1958, before moving to study English literature at Trinity College, Cambridge that same year.

== Career ==
From 1962 until 1970 he was a director and film editor at the BBC. He left to enter academia at the Polytechnic of Central London to teach film making and film theory. Garnham was central in establishing first Media Studies degree at the University, a Bachelor of Arts course in 1975. He also became part of the university's newly established Communication Studies Department. He was Governor of the British Film Institute (BFI) from 1973 to 1977. He was founding editor of, and has remained a senior editor of, the journal Media, Culture and Society since it was first published in 1979.

== Works ==
- The New Priesthood: British Television Today (1970) with Joan Bakewell
- Samuel Fuller (1971)
- Structures of Television (1972)
- The Economics of Television (1988) with Richard Collins and Gareth Locksley
- Capitalism and Communication: Global Culture and the Economics of Information (1990) editor Fred Inglis
- Emancipation, The Media, And Modernity: Arguments about the Media and Social Theory (2000)
- The Information Society is also a Class Society – The Impact of the New Information Technologies on Cultural Production and Consumption, Information Technology: Impact on the Way of Life (L. Bannion et al., eds). Dublin: Tycooly International (1981)
- The Economics of Television, (1987) with R. Collins and G. Locksley
- The Media and the Public Sphere (Ed. Calhoun) (1992)
- The Role of the Public Sphere in the Information Society, in Regulating the Global Information Society (C.T. Marsden, ed.), London: Routledge. (2000)
- Information Society as Theory or Ideology: A Critical Perspective on Technology, Education and Employment in the Information Age Digital Academe (W. Dutton and B. Loader, eds), pp. 253–67. London: Routledge. (2002)
