= Climate change video game =

An in-game screenshot from Fate of the World, a global warming game

A climate change video game, also known as a global warming game, is a type of serious game.

As a serious game, it attempts to simulate and explore real life issues to educate players through an interactive experience. The issues particular to a global warming video game are usually energy efficiency and the implementation of green technology as ways to reduce greenhouse gas emissions and thus counteract global warming. Global warming games include traditional board games, video games, and other varieties such as role-playing and simulation-assisted multiplayer games.

== Concept ==
The primary objectives of global warming games are threefold:

1. To develop the player's familiarity and knowledge of the issue of global warming and related issues
2. To make the player aware of the challenges and obstacles that are faced when addressing global warming
3. Occasionally, the games encourage players to develop ideas and solutions to global warming

The first objective is universal to global warming games. The issues surrounding global warming commonly included are CO_{2} emissions and the emission of other greenhouse gases, the melting of the polar ice caps, sea-level rise, natural disasters and massive changes to lifestyles caused by global warming. Games that do not go beyond the objective of knowledge and familiarity tend to be designed for younger audiences. Games designed for young children often only have the goal to engage the children enough to excite their attention to focus on these basic concepts.

The second objective is integrated into games in a variety of ways. Sometimes demonstrating the challenges of confronting global warming are put directly into the style of gameplay, e.g. to demonstrate the difficulty of international cooperation, players are made to represent different countries and are required to negotiate to fulfill game objectives. Other times, the game includes the challenges as a part of the mechanics, e.g. building 'green factories' is more expensive than building 'black factories.'

The final objective is shared by the most interactive and engaging global warming games. Developing solutions to global warming includes two major types of response: mitigation of emissions and global warming's effects, and adaptation to live sustainably in a new climate. Typically players are given a variety of different options so that they may come up with a number of different creative solutions. Sometimes players are even allowed freedom to create their own unique options to integrate into their strategy.

=== Design ===
Climate change games can be differentiated from other games that depict climate change for entertainment. As a type of serious game, climate change games often engage players with action-oriented goals and explicit challenges relating to the environment to encourage feedback and learning.

=== Impact ===
Climate change games have been identified as a useful educational tool. Meya & Eisenack identified a climate change game as a useful source of experiential learning, with a positive association with student views on political and international co-operation to address climate change. Pfirman et al. observed a game to have higher engagement and as effective in teaching and assessing content on climate change as reading an illustrated article.

However, more work is needed to confirm the extent of the impact of climate change games to broader audiences. Kwok notes that educational games may have a bias as they attract players that are already informed and concerned about climate change. Razali et al. have also observed that many climate change games are small and lack the sophistication to inform players on more complex aspects of climate change, such as the carbon cycle.

== History ==
Climate change games were initially categorized as a subset of simulation video games relating to political and environmental issues. Ulrich identified 31 titles in 1997, with most games intended to instruct a professional or educational audience. A 2013 review by Reckien & Eisenack observed that the number and sophistication of climate change games accelerated in the late 2000s.

== Notable examples ==
=== Act to Adapt ===
Act to Adapt, developed by PLAN International, the Red Cross Red Crescent Climate Centre, the Engagement Lab at Emerson College, and the Philippines Red Cross, is a giant board game that divides 10–30 players into a 'community team' and a 'hazard team.' The community team must prioritize and protect vulnerable community resources from the hazard team, which represents extreme weather events which become more intense and frequent with each round. The game was created as part of the Y-adapt curriculum, intended to help children understand climate change.

=== Adaptation ===
Adaptation from Adaptation Scotland is a board game for teams of people using dice to move around the board, landing on squares which either cost money or save money due to destructive weather and adaptation investments. At the end of the game, the team with the most money wins. Adaptation Scotland would like players to play after experiencing their "Introduction to Adaptation" presentation, which is regularly updated. Interested parties can request the most recent version by emailing Adaptation Scotland.

=== Cantor's World ===
Cantor's World, created by UNESCO MGIEP (United Nations Educational, Scientific and Cultural Organization and the Mahatma Gandhi Institute of Education for Peace and Sustainable Development) and Fields of View, requires players to act as countries' chief policymakers, and to set sustainable development goals and then invest in policies to realize those goals. Players are able to see the results of their policies in Gross National Development, Human Development Index and Inclusive Wealth Index, and it focuses on Sustainability Goal #13, "Take urgent action to combat climate change and its impacts". The game is intended to be played in universities by students of public policy, economics, and sustainability studies.

As of 2023, this game is only available through universities.

=== Carbon City Zero ===
Carbon City Zero is a global warming game published by the climate action charity Possible in January 2021.The game is a collaborative deck-building card game for 1–4 people in which players take on the role of city mayors working to develop sustainable cities by greening transport, transforming industries, and getting their citizens on board. Since its release on Kickstarter, the game has been made available as a free print-and-play download via PnP Arcade and as an online game on Tabletopia.

=== Climate Action Simulation ===
Climate Action Simulation is an interactive role-playing game co-developed by Climate Interactive, the MIT Sloan Sustainability Initiative, and the UMass Lowell Climate Change Initiative. for groups to explore the different stakeholders and solutions that need to cooperate in order to take action on climate change. It uses the En-ROADS simulator, allowing participants to assess the impacts of different solutions to climate change. The game mimics a United Nations emergency climate summit to develop a plan limiting global warming through collaboration between government, business, and civil society representatives.

=== Climate Adaptation Game ===
Climate Adaptation Game was developed by Swedish National Knowledge Center for Climate Change Adaptation and Linköping University. In a review published by the Multidisciplinary Digital Publishing Institute, the authors wrote that "aims to provide an experience of the impact of climate adaptation measures, and illustrates links with selected Agenda 2030 goals, which the player has to consider, while limiting impacts of hazardous climate events. The game design builds on the key goals in Education for Sustainable Development combining comprehensive views, action competence, learner engagement and pluralism. This study draws on game sessions and surveys with high school students in Sweden, and aims to assess to what extent different aspects of the game can support an increased understanding of the needs and benefits of adaptation actions."

=== Climate Challenge ===
Climate Challenge is a Flash-based simulation game produced by the BBC and developed by Red Redemption Ltd. Players manage the economy and resources of the 'European Nations' as its president, while reducing emissions of CO_{2} to combat climate change and managing crises. Climate Challenge is an environmental serious game, designed to give players an understanding of the science behind climate change, as well as the options available to policy makers and the difficulties in their implementation.

=== Coral Bleaching ===
Coral Bleaching is a simple online game for young children. Players can experiment with the effects of changing the temperature, level of pollution and storms on bleaching coral.

=== Crabby's Reef ===
Crabby's Reef is a classic arcade-style game created at SeriousGeoGames Lab in the Energy and Environment Institute at the University of Hull, UK. Players search for food and avoid predators. As they advance, they move into a future where increasing ocean acidity makes survival more difficult.

=== Cranky Uncle ===
The Cranky Uncle game was developed by Monash University scientist John Cook, in collaboration with creative agency Goodbeast. It uses cartoons and critical thinking to counter climate change denial. It is available for free on iPhone, Android, and as a browser game.

=== CrowdWater game ===
CrowdWater game is based on data from the CrowdWater app. comes from the Hydrology and Climate group (H2K) within the Department of Geography at the University of Zurich. App users contribute photos of water levels worldwide. Photo pairs from the same site can then be compared to each other in the CrowdWater game to verify the incoming data and to improve the quality of water level time series. Players can earn points, and every month they can win prizes.

Software company SPOTTERON developed and maintains the app and handles legal aspects of collecting such data.

=== Dissolving Disasters ===
Dissolving Disasters was designed for the Rockefeller Foundation Workshop Series on Resilience, held in New York City during July and August 2011. This game was developed with support from the American Red Cross (International Services Team), and from a research grant to the Red Cross Red Crescent Climate Centre from the Climate and Development Knowledge Network (CDKN Action Lab Innovation Fund). Played in an open, rectangular space where players have room to walk, participants act as subsistence farmers facing changing risks due to climate change.

=== EcoChains ===
EcoChains, a board game designed by Joey J. Lee and Stephanie Pfirman and published by Jogolabs, requires players to use action cards to prevent climate change from destroying Arctic food chains.

=== Energy Transition Game ===
The Energy Transition Game, intended for a wide range of stakeholders, from financial institutions and government officials to non-government organizations and community members, takes players through the process of developing a transition from fossil fuels to renewable energy in spite of resistance against such change.

=== Fate of the World ===
Fate of the World is a 2011 Microsoft Windows and Mac OS game developed and published by Red Redemption, the developers of Climate Challenge. It focuses on global governance, with goals ranging from improving living conditions in Africa, to preventing catastrophic climate change, to exacerbating it. It is based around an intricate model of populations, economic production and greenhouse emissions based on real-world data.

=== Flower ===
Flower is a video game developed by Thatgamecompany and published by Sony Computer Entertainment. It was designed by Jenova Chen and Nicholas Clark and was released in February 2009 on the PlayStation 3, via the PlayStation Network. PlayStation 4 and PlayStation Vita versions of the game were ported by Bluepoint Games and released in November 2013. An iOS version was released in September 2017, and a Windows version was released in February 2019, both published by Annapurna Interactive. The game was intended as a "spiritual successor" to Flow, a previous title by Chen and Thatgamecompany. In Flower, the player controls the wind, blowing a flower petal through the air using the movement of the game controller. Flying close to flowers results in the player's petal being followed by other flower petals. Approaching flowers may also have side-effects on the game world, such as bringing vibrant color to previously dead fields or activating stationary wind turbines. The game features no text or dialogue, forming a narrative arc primarily through visual representation and emotional cues.

Flower was primarily intended to arouse positive emotions in the player, rather than to be a challenging and "fun" game. This focus was sparked by Chen, who felt that the primary purpose of entertainment products like video games was the feelings that they evoked in the audience and that the emotional range of most games was very limited. The team viewed their efforts as creating a work of art, removing gameplay elements and mechanics that were not provoking the desired response in the players. The music, composed by Vincent Diamante, dynamically responds to the player's actions and corresponds with the emotional cues in the game. Flower was a critical success, to the surprise of the developers. Reviewers praised the game's music, visuals, and gameplay, calling it a unique and compelling emotional experience. It was named the "best independent game of 2009" at the Spike Video Game Awards, and won the "Casual Game of the Year" award by the Academy of Interactive Arts and Sciences.

=== Gender and Climate Game ===
Gender and Climate Game is an experiential learning and communication game for teaching the different vulnerabilities of women and men facing climate change. Similar to the Dissolving Disasters game from the same source (see above), players first take on the role of subsistence farmers facing changing risks, and then experience how that role changes with a change of gender.

The game was developed with support from the American Red Cross (International Services Team), and from a research grant to the Red Cross/Red Crescent Climate Centre from the Climate and Development Knowledge Network (CDKN Action Lab Innovation Fund).

=== Go Goals! ===
Go Goals!, created by United Nations Regional Information Centre for Western Europe, is a board game available in multiple languages that is intended to help children understand the United Nations' Sustainable Development Goals.

=== Greenhouse Gas Game ===
The Greenhouse Gas Game is part of the Y-adapt curriculum intended to help children understand climate change. The game was created by the Red Cross Red Crescent Climate Centre, the Engagement Lab at Emerson College, and the Philippines Red Cross. Players act as either incoming sunlight heat or as greenhouse gasses to learn how those gasses trap heat, and how that is related to global warming, as well as the hazardous effects of global warming.

=== Invest in the Future ===
Invest in the Future, based on the Flexible Forward-thinking Decision-Making game originally designed by Antidote Games and developed with the Red Cross Red Crescent Climate Centre for use with district planners, is a card game combining strategy and story-telling to inspire players to consider climate change as they make sustainable investment choices. It has been redesigned as an experiential learning game for young people in Southeast Asia by the enGAgeMEnt Lab at Emerson College, in collaboration with the Red Cross Red Crescent Climate Centre.

=== Keep Cool ===
Keep Cool is a board game created by the Potsdam Institute for Climate Impact Research and published by the German company Spieltrieb in November 2004. Up to six players representing the world's countries compete to balance their own economic interests and the world's climate in a game of negotiation. The goal of the game as stated by the authors is to "promote the general knowledge on climate change and the understanding of difficulties and obstacles, and "to make it available for a board game and still retain the major elements and processes." A quantitative-empirical study with more than 200 students shows that Keep Cool facilitates experimental learning about climate change and helps "to develop individual beliefs about sustainable development by experiencing complex system dynamics that are not tangible in everyday life."

=== LogiCity ===
LogiCity is an interactive Flash-based virtual-reality based computer game, produced by Logicom and the National Energy Foundation, an English charity. The game is set in a 3D virtual city with five main activities where players are set the task of reducing the carbon footprint of an average resident. At the end of the game they are taken forward to 2066 to see if they have done enough to save England from the worst problems associated with global climate change. The game's conclusion and focus on 2066 is designed to bring home to players the reality of the changes they may face in their lifetime. In response to low interest in the game, there was an online discussion about revamping the game to make the game and players larger.

The game was created as part of Defra's (Department for Environment, Food and Rural Affairs) Climate Challenge programme to increase public awareness of Climate Change across the country. The National Energy Foundation, Logicom and British Gas also provided support to the game's development. LogiCity is designed to be used both by individuals and in an educational context. It is stated to be suitable for most children from the ages of 10 or 11 upward (English KS3+), although the main target group is young adults aged 16–26.

=== Master that Disaster ===
Master that Disaster was developed in collaboration with the United Nations Food and Agriculture Organization, based on a disaster risk financing game created for the World Bank Disaster Risk Financing and Insurance (DRFI) Program. Players take the role of subsistence farmers, who face changing risks as a result of climate change. They must make individual and collective decisions and then learn the consequences of those decisions. The game is intended for disaster managers, policy makers, and donors, and it should be played in a large room with tables and chairs.

=== Minions of Disruption ===
In the board game Minions of Disruption, developed by Shu Liang, the founder and director of Day of Adaptation, players are colleagues in organizations or neighbors from the same community combating climate minions, Carbions and Climmies, that cause climate change. Players cooperate to activate Zillians, superheroes who provide organizations with resilience for a sustainable future.

=== New Shores: a Game for Democracy ===
New Shores: a Game for Democracy, developed by the Centre for Systems Solutions (CRS), sets players on an imaginary island with a lush forest canopy over useful coal deposits that could improve the island's economy. They can either collaborate democratically to achieve the best outcome for all, or serve their own needs, disregarding the welfare of the rest of the island's inhabitants with attendant consequences.

=== Paying for Predictions ===
Support for developing the Paying for Predictions game came from the American Red Cross International Services Team, and from a research grant to the Red Cross Red Crescent Climate Centre from the Climate and Development Knowledge Network (CDKN Action Lab Innovation Fund). In a room furnished with tables and chairs, players act as humanitarian workers facing changing climate risks and making individual and collective decisions with consequences. Players can win as individuals or groups: the individual winner has the most resources remaining at the end of the game, and the group winner has the fewest humanitarian crises.

The game is intended for a range of professions: disaster managers, volunteers, branch officers, meteorological service authorities, donors, etc.

=== PHUSICOS NBS simulation ===
The PHUSICOS NBS (Nature Based Solutions) simulation was created by the Centre for Systems Solutions (CRS) and the International Institute for Applied Systems Analysis (IIASA) with funding from European Union's Horizon 2020 research and innovation programme. The game is intended for a variety of users, including educators, sustainability experts, public administrators, and members of local communities, and it simulates how nature-based solutions may be developed by stakeholders with varying interests and worldviews. Role playing requires players to consider climate change issues from other stakeholder's viewpoints.

=== Ready ===
Ready, which was developed with help from the American Red Cross International Services Team and a research grant to the Red Cross Red Crescent Climate Centre from the Climate and Development Knowledge Network (CDKN Action Lab Innovation Fund), is a physical game intended for community members with assistance from disaster managers and volunteers to inspire conversations about location-specific disaster preparedness and disaster risk reduction.

=== Rescue Polar Bears ===
Rescue Polar Bears is a board game designed by Darren Black and Huang Yi Ming with art by Collin Wang. Players co-operate with each other by choosing actions and card effects in order to save all the polar bears before the ice they stand on melts. Each player chooses a ship representing a nation, and different ships have different abilities.

=== Shocks and Shields ===
Shocks and Shields was modified by The Red Cross Red Crescent Climate Centre from an activity introduced by the Applied Improvisation Network, and it is licensed under a Creative Commons Attribution-NonCommercial-ShareAlike 4.0 International License. Players experience having to migrate following climate shocks, and the game is intended to create a sense of bonding among participants.

=== Stabilization Wedge Game ===
The Stabilization Wedge Game, or what is commonly referred to as simply the "wedge game", is a serious game produced by Princeton University's Carbon Mitigation Initiative. The goal of the game creators, Stephen W. Pacala and Robert H. Socolow, is to demonstrate that global warming is a problem which can be solved by implementing today's technologies to reduce CO_{2} emissions. The object of the game is to keep the next fifty years of CO_{2} emissions flat, using seven wedges from a variety of different strategies which fit into the stabilization triangle.

=== Survive the Century ===
Survive the Century is a game created in part by Climate Interactive and the National Socio-Environmental Synthesis Center in North Carolina, along with other partners. The game takes players through different climate action scenarios and their impacts using science to educate players about the climate-related political, environmental, and social choices humans will face over the next century. It can be played online or via the book version.

=== The 30-Day Minimalism Game ===
Developed by The Minimalists Joshua Fields Millburn and Ryan Nicodemus, The 30-Day Minimalism Game requires two or more people to minimize their belongings over the course of a month. Each person gets rid of one thing on the first day of the month, two things on the second, three things on the third, and so on. Each material possession must leave the home by midnight each day. The winner is whoever keeps it going the longest wins.

=== The Climate Game ===
Created by The Financial Times and Infosys, challenges players to cut energy-related carbon dioxide and other greenhouse gas emissions significantly by 2050. Central to the game's structure was the Net Zero By 2050 report from the International Energy Agency.

The game's questions follow the three pathways the IEA's World Energy Outlook 2021 report used for cutting emissions, and they relate to electricity, transport, buildings and industry: the four sectors principally responsible for energy-related CO_{2} emissions. Answers have a direct impact on both emissions and global temperatures.

=== The Road to 10 Gigatons ===
Developed by Max Pisciotta, Cassandra Xia and John Sanchez, The Road to 10 Gigatons is an interactive online game requiring players to experiment with different atmospheric carbon removal solutions. This is a simple, one-page game, where players move the marker on different types of carbon removal systems to see what combination would be necessary to remove 10 Gigatons of carbon from the atmosphere by 2050, as recommended by the IPCC.

=== The World's Future ===
The World's Future, developed by the Centre for Systems Solutions (CRS) and the International Institute for Applied Systems Analysis (IIASA), is a card-driven board game intended for everyone from public administrators and members of non-governmental organizations to youths. Players consider tradeoffs, such as whether it is possible to provide food for all without exceeding the boundaries of natural ecosystems, or how we might increase climate change mitigation while generating enough energy to meet everyone's basic essential needs.

=== Urban Climate Architect ===
Urban Climate Architect, created by the Hamburg University Cluster of Excellence CliSAP, is an online climate game specific to the challenges of urban settings. Players can develop the city, adding buildings for residence, commerce and industry as well as natural spaces like parks and ponds while noting the effects such changes have on the city's climate.

=== World Climate Simulation ===
The World Climate Simulation game from Climate Interactive, the MIT Sloan Sustainability Initiative, and the UMass Lowell Climate Change Initiative, is an in-person role-playing exercise of the UN climate change negotiations. Participants learn how nations can address global climate change with the help of Climate Interactive's C-ROADS simulator, which allows users to analyze the results of the game.

== Xbox 360 Games for Change Challenge ==
The Xbox 360 Games for Change Challenge is a collaborative effort between Microsoft and Games for Change (G4C), a subgroup of the Serious Games Initiative. The challenge is a worldwide competition to develop a global warming game with Microsoft's XNA Game Studio Express software. Winners will be awarded scholarships from Games for Change and Microsoft, and the winning games will have the possibility of being available for download on the Xbox Live Arcade service. The Xbox 360 Games for Change Challenge has been cast by Microsoft as a "socially-minded" initiative, joining the larger serious games movement. Suzanne Seggerman, a co-founder of Games for Change, shared these comments in a radio interview:

Think about how this next generation of kids could be inspired to be environmentalists and humanitarians. You know I'd like to see also, a thousand little game seeds planted. Not all the games are going to get prizes and not even that many are going to get recognized. But think of this new generation of game-makers and game innovators we're reaching. All these kids who've perhaps never even considered the impact of the environment are going to be getting knee deep in environmental issues. That's really exciting. You know kids really respond to this medium of video games in a way they don't to a newspaper or a heavy documentary. And I think that's the key. It's that we're reaching them on their own turf.

— Suzanne Seggerman

== See also ==
- Climate change in popular culture
