= New Media & Society =

- Discipline: Sociology, Media, Communication
- Language: English
- Edited by: Steve Jones

Publication details
- History: 1999-present
- Publisher: SAGE Publishing
- Frequency: 8/year
- Impact factor: 5 (2022)

Standard abbreviations
- ISO 4: New Media Soc.

Indexing
- ISSN: 1461-4448 (print); 1461-7315 (web)
- LCCN: 00212321
- OCLC no.: 41428149

Links
- Journal homepage; Online access; Online archive

New Media & Society is a peer-reviewed academic journal covering the fields of sociology, media, and communication. The journal's editor-in-chief is Steve Jones (University of Illinois at Chicago). It has been in publication since 1999 and is published by SAGE Publishing.

== Abstracting and indexing ==
The journal is abstracted and indexed in Scopus and the Social Sciences Citation Index. According to the Journal Citation Reports, its 2022 impact factor is 5, ranking it 13 out of 96 journals in the category "Communication".
