= International Journal of Intelligence and CounterIntelligence =

- Discipline: Political science, intelligence studies
- Language: English
- Edited by: Jan Goldman

Publication details
- History: 1986-present
- Publisher: Routledge
- Frequency: Quarterly

Standard abbreviations
- ISO 4: Int. J. Intell. Counterintell.

Indexing
- ISSN: 0885-0607 (print); 1521-0561 (web)
- LCCN: 86642847
- OCLC no.: 12566055

Links
- Journal homepage; Online access; Online archive

The International Journal of Intelligence and CounterIntelligence is a quarterly academic journal about intelligence studies and responses to intelligence activities. All articles submitted to this journal undergo editorial screening and review. The journal was established in 1986 and is published by Routledge. The editor-in-chief is Jan Goldman.

== Abstracting and indexing ==
The journal is abstracted and indexed in EBSCO databases and Scopus.
