= First We Bombed New Mexico =

2023 documentary film

- Poster
- Directed by: Lois Lipman
- Written by: Lois Lipman; Joel Marcus
- Produced by: Lois Lipman
- Edited by: Joel Marcus
- Production company: 47th State Films
- Release date: October 20, 2023 (Santa Fe International Film Festival)
- Running time: 95 minutes

First We Bombed New Mexico is a 2023 documentary film directed and produced by Lois Lipman that follows activist Tina Cordova's efforts to bring attention to the cancers and deaths caused by radiation from the Trinity nuclear test impacting New Mexico’s mostly Hispanic and Native American communities. It examines the long-term effects of radiation exposure and the U.S. government's efforts to conceal the consequences on generations of families due the radiation fallout. The documentary was shown at film festivals from 2023 to 2025 and was re-edited by Lipman after New Mexicans were added to the Radiation Exposure Compensation Act in July 2025 to include footage from after this time and complete the narrative arc.

== Synopsis and background ==
The film explores two groups in the Southwest devastated by the nuclear industry: the Downwinders, families who lived near the Trinity site, and Native and Hispanic uranium miners whose communities and sacred lands were scarred by government mining operations after 1971. Together, their stories trace a legacy of illness, environmental damage, and neglect.

Residents in New Mexico's Tularosa Basin were exposed to radiation from the Trinity test on July 16, 1945, when J. Robert Oppenheimer and the Manhattan Project carried out the world's first atomic bomb detonation. Predominantly Hispanic and Native American communities near the site were never warned or compensated despite toxic fallout, and cancer rates in surrounding towns remain far higher than the national average. Filmmaker Lois Lipman was struck by the silence surrounding New Mexico's fallout victims and spent ten years documenting their fight for recognition. She followed Tularosa resident Tina Cordova, co-founder of the Tularosa Basin Downwinders Consortium (2005), as she appeared before Congress, organized town halls, and gathered testimonies from community members. Cordova argues that the government relied on those affected being uneducated and unable to speak up for themselves.

== Compensation for victims of radiation exposure ==
While the U.S. Senate passed legislation to expand the Radiation Exposure Compensation Act to include New Mexico's Downwinders in 2024, the House blocked it over cost concerns. Lipman hoped that bringing the story to film festivals in the Eastern United States would build the pressure needed for change. Cordova contrasted the documentary with Christopher Nolan’s film Oppenheimer, noting its silence on both New Mexican and Japanese victims. For her, screenings in Massachusetts carried symbolic weight, recalling President John F. Kennedy’s role in the 1963 Nuclear Test Ban Treaty and U.S. compensation for other atomic testing victims.

The film was screened at the Oppenheimer festival in 2024 in Los Alamos where Lipman said she hoped that if more people saw the film, the US government would be more likely to pass legislation expanding health care coverage via the Radiation Exposure Compensation Act (RECA) to radiation victims in New Mexico. One year later in July 2025, a federal spending law included an expansion of RECA to include New Mexicans. Those who enroll within two years and meet the criteria will receive, in most cases, a $100,000 one-time payment. Following the inclusion of New Mexico in the RECA expansion, Lipman re-edited the documentary to include footage from after the legislation passed to complete the story arc.

== Awards and recognition ==
- Santa Fe International Film Festival: Best New Mexico Documentary Feature and Audience Choice Best Competition Documentary Feature (2023)
- Austin Film Festival: Best Documentary Feature (2023)
- Flagstaff International Film Festival: Grand Jury Award (2024)
- Gig Harbor Film Festival: Best Documentary Feature Film (2024)
- Palm Springs International Film Festival: Best of Fest Audience Favorite (2024)
- Southern Utah International Documentary Film Festival (Docutah): Activist Award (2024)
- Cine Paris Film Festival: Best Director, Documentary & Best Green and Environment (2025)
- San Antonio Film Festival: Best Historical Documentary (2025)
- Worldwide Women's Film Festival: Best Documentary Feature, Best Social Awareness Film, Audience Choice Award - Feature (2025)
