= Tina Cordova =

American businesswoman and activist

Tina Cordova (born 1959) is a New Mexican businesswoman and activist. She was named New Mexico Small Business Person of the Year in 2000. Around the same time she was diagnosed with thyroid cancer, and she became more aware of the unusually high incidence of cancers and death among friends and family in her community of Tularosa, New Mexico due to their proximity to the Trinity test site. In 2005, she co-founded the Tularosa Basin Downwinders Consortium to seek a federal apology and compensation for those with illnesses and cancers resulting from radiation exposure due to the Trinity test. She is the subject of the documentary film First We Bombed New Mexico.

== Early life and education ==
Cordova was born in 1959 and reared in Tularosa, New Mexico. She is the daughter of Tony Cordova, who managed a grocery store, and Rosalie Cordova, who stayed at home to raise four children before entering the property appraisal business. She is the oldest of her four siblings. In 1977, she graduated valedictorian of Tularosa High School and earned a Bachelor's degree (1981) and a Master of Science degree (1983) in biology from New Mexico Highlands University. She attended University of New Mexico medical school from 1983 to 1986 but left to support her son as a single mother. She worked as a waitress and discovered that she enjoyed the business environment.

== Business career ==
In 1990, she co-founded Queston Construction in Albuquerque, New Mexico, which grew from $50,000 in sales and two full-time employees to $2.5 million in sales and 26 employees by 1998, at which time it was named among the Fastest Growing 100 Hispanic-owned businesses in the United States by Hispano Business. In 1999, she received the Adelante Female Small Business Owner award from Hispanic Magazine and the following year was named New Mexico Small Business Person of the Year. Hispanic Magazine also named her as a Top 100 Entrepreneur in 2001.

== Cancer from radiation exposure ==
In 1998, the year Cordova was recognized for her success in business, she was diagnosed with thyroid cancer. Her doctor asked if she'd been exposed to high levels of radiation, and she knew the exposure likely came from having grown up in a town which had radioactive fallout from atomic bomb tests. Her father and multiple other family members died from cancer. Her grandmother had told stories about the day in 1945 about the ash that fell from the sky after the Trinity nuclear test. Family members recalled people collecting glassy green rocks from the crater resulting from the test. From her education, Cordova understood that fallout from the Trinity nuclear test likely led to her family and community members' cancers and early deaths.

== Advocacy for New Mexico's inclusion in RECA ==
In 2005 she and Fred Tyler founded the Tularosa Basin Downwinders Consortium, to advocate for benefits for New Mexicans harmed by the 1945 detonation. Downwinders in Nevada, Utah and Arizona had been able to receive federal compensation for the health problems they suffered after the nuclear detonations at the Nevada Test Site. Cordova pointed out that the government failed to monitor the effects of the Trinity test fallout at the time and in the decades that followed and thus should receive federal compensation. She obtained health surveys and collected stories from New Mexicans affected by radiation fallout, wrote columns in the Albuquerque Journal starting in 2010, encouraged people to call and write their congress members, and organized protests outside the gates of the Trinity Site.

Tyler died in 2014 but Cordova continued advocating for the New Mexico downwinders, eventually getting the attention of publications such as The Wall Street Journal, Time Magazine, and Al Jazeera in 2015. Around this time director Lois Lipman began following her appearing before Congress, holding town halls, and spending time with community members. Ten years later, Lipman released the documentary film First We Bombed New Mexico at the Santa Fe Film Festival in 2023, which documents Cordova's efforts to obtain an apology and compensation from the federal government for the mostly Native American and Hispanic communities in New Mexico who were harmed by radiation fallout from the Trinity Bomb.

Cordova worked with New Mexico congress members like Senator Ben Ray Lujan to get New Mexicans covered in the Radiation Exposure Compensation Act (RECA). In 2023, Lujan proposed a bill that would extend by 19 years the RECA program sunset date of 2024 and also include New Mexico and other states which had been affected by radiation fallout but not yet included in RECA. In 2024, the U.S. Senate passed a bill to recognize downwinders in states not originally covered by RECA but it stalled in the House, and Cordova and others came out to demonstrate when House Speaker Mike Johnson campaigned for Yvette Herrell in Las Cruces that year. It was in July 2025 that a federal spending law included an expansion of RECA to include New Mexicans. Those who enroll within two years and meet the criteria will receive, in most cases, a $100,000 one-time payment. Cordova estimates that approximately 10,000 people had health impacts related to the Trinity test.

In 2023, Cordova received the Health Hero Award from Physicians for Social Responsibility.
