= Fallout from the Trinity nuclear test =

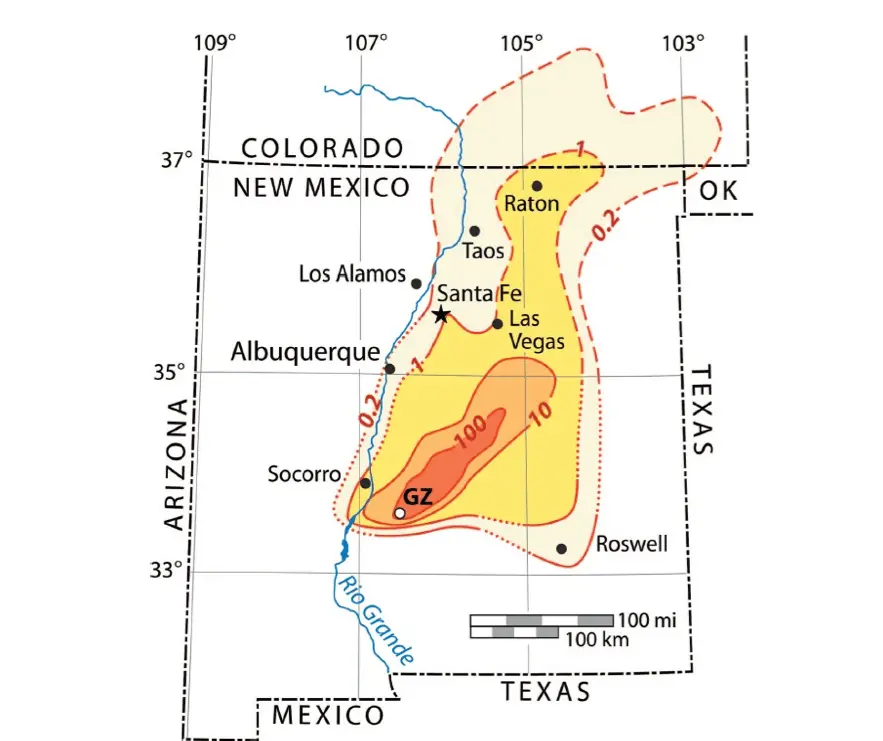
Trinity test fallout pattern, 12 hours after test, in rads

Fallout from the Trinity nuclear test in 1945, the first detonation of a nuclear weapon, affected a broad swath of eastern New Mexico with hundreds of thousands of people exposed to radioactivity. The counties at most risk had a population of about 65,000. The priority of the US government was to develop a bomb that could be used to end World War II. The scientists and the military conducting the test had limited insight and paid little attention to the impact of radioactive fallout on the health of local residents. Radioactive fallout was heaviest 20 miles (32 km) to the northeast of the bomb test and in one location at that distance fallout was measured at levels likely to cause serious illness. Not many locations were monitored.

According to studies undertaken decades after the bomb test, cancers attributable to fallout probably numbered several hundred. Anecdotal evidence cites many deaths, especially a high incidence of death among infants born shortly after the test. Compensation by the US to people impacted by later nuclear tests in Nevada did not include New Mexicans impacted by the Trinity nuclear test.

== Trinity ==
The Trinity nuclear test took place on the morning of July 16, 1945 on what is now the White Sands Missile Range in New Mexico. The bomb was detonated on top of a 100 ft (30 m) tower. The bomb contained 13 lb (5.9 kg) of plutonium, but only about three pounds was necessary to create a critical mass of fissionable material for a bomb. The remaining 10 pounds of plutonium was dispersed in the fireball and cloud that followed the blast and climbed to an altitude of an estimated 60,000 ft (18,000 m) into the atmosphere, much higher than the scientists predicted. The explosion also swept up into the fireball hundreds of tons of dirt from below the tower which became highly radioactive. The distribution far and wide of the excess plutonium plus the radioactive dirt gave the Trinity test the characteristics of what would later be called a dirty bomb.

The test was conducted with a maximum of secrecy, but the fireball and the emblematic mushroom cloud were seen as far away as 160 miles (260 km) in Albuquerque and El Paso. The radioactive cloud broke into three parts. One part drifted east, a second west and northwest, and the third and largest to the northeast where it covered an area 100 miles (160 km) long and 30 miles (48 km) wide. The cloud from the blast was visible near Vaughn, 96 miles (154 km) from the Trinity site.

A cover story distributed to newspapers explained what was seen by New Mexicans after the blast. "A remotely located ammunition magazine containing a considerable amount of high explosives and pyrotechnics exploded. There was no loss of life or injury to anyone, and the property damage outside of the explosive magazine itself was negligible. Weather conditions affecting the content of the gas shells exploded by the blast may make it desirable for the Army to temporarily evacuate a few citizens from their homes."

== The scientists and the military ==
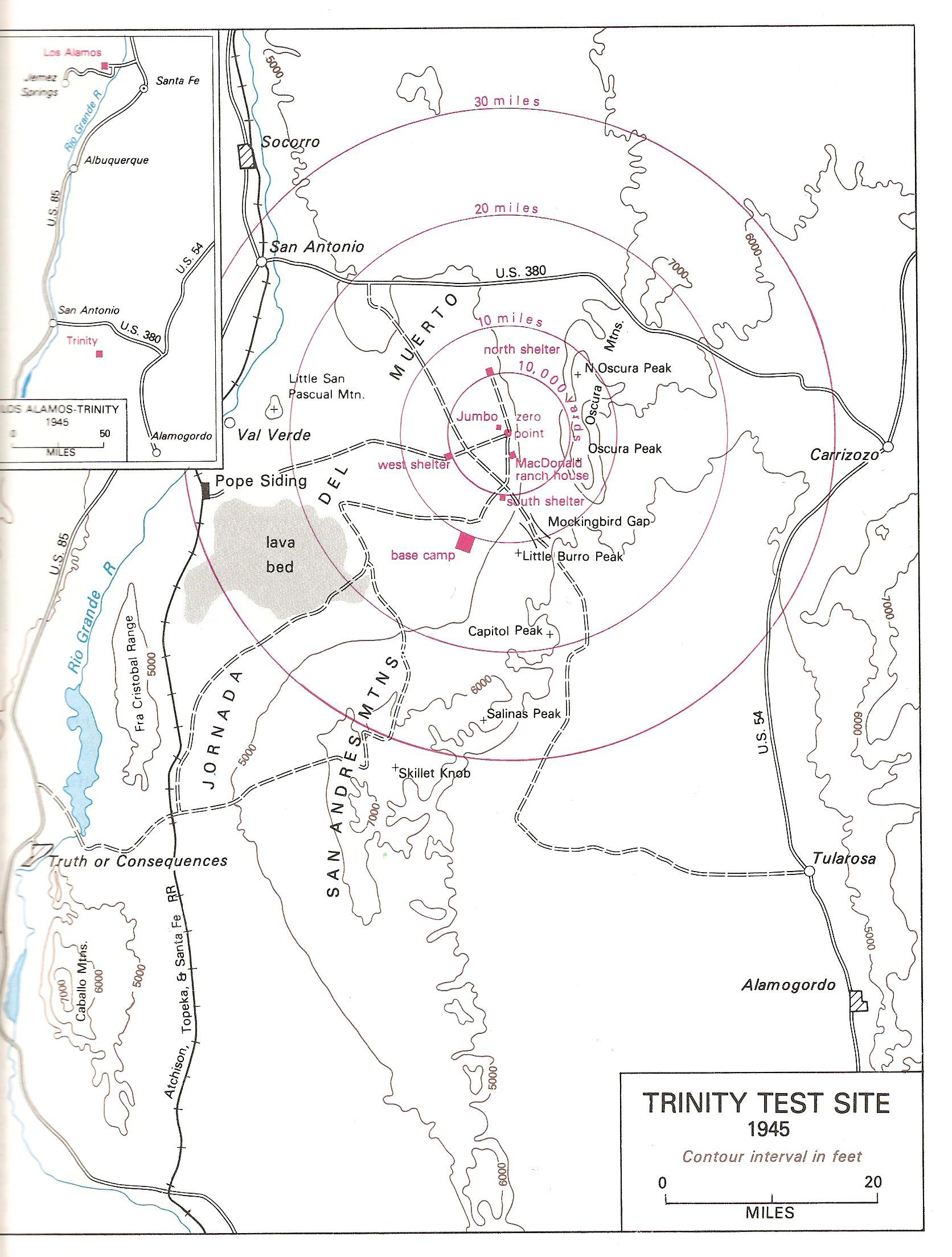
Map of the Trinity Site. The highest radiation detected was 20 miles (32 km) to the northeast of the detonation site.

Army officer Leslie Groves led the Manhattan Project to build the bomb. He and a sizeable contingent of scientists and military personnel observed the blast from bunkers constructed 10,000 yd (9,100 m) from the blast site. J. Robert Oppenheimer headed the scientists. They had little insight as to what would happen when the bomb was detonated. Their speculations of what the bomb would yield in its explosion varied from 300 to 45,000 tons of TNT. (In 2021, the yield of the Trinity bomb was calculated to have been 24,800 tons of TNT.) The initial euphoria of the scientists that their work had succeeded faded quickly as they became aware that "something very grave and strong had happened..." In a seminar five days later British mathematician William Penny emphasized the gravity saying that "this [weapon] would reduce a city of three or four hundred thousand people to nothing but a sink for disaster relief, bandages, and hospitals."

The scientists thought that the dangers to the public from the Trinity test "were modest given the proper weather." However, the weather (which was not ideal) became secondary to the desire of President Harry Truman to inform allies of the bomb at the Potsdam Conference, which convened on July 16.

Scientists were aware of the risk of radioactive fallout. Five years before the bomb blast, physicists Otto Frisch and Rudolf Peierls said, "Owing to the spread of radioactive substances with the wind, the bomb could probably not be used without killing large numbers of civilians...[I]t would be very important to have an organization which determines the exact extent of the danger area, by means of ionization measurements, so that people can be warned from entering it." In June 1945, two physicists warned that "radiation effects might cause considerable damage in addition to the blast damage ordinarily considered." One of the scientists, Joseph O. Hirschfelder later said, "very few people believed us when we predicted radioactive fallout from the atom bomb." Less than a month before the Trinity test, Stafford Warren, chief of the medical section of the Manhattan Project, persuaded Groves to assemble a team to track radioactive fallout, "a hasty effort motivated primarily by concern over legal liability." A critic later said that "the spectre of lawsuits haunted the military, and most of the authorities simply wanted to put the whole test and its aftermath out of sight and mind."

General Groves concluded that the Trinity site "is too small for a repetition of a similar test of this magnitude except under very special conditions." He proposed that future tests have a site "with a radius of at least 150 miles without population."

== Civilian population ==
The official report of Los Alamos National Laboratory (LANL) said that "wartime pressures to maintain secrecy and minimize legal claims led to decisions that would not likely have been made in later tests." Military and scientific personnel on the scene took precautionary measures to avoid radiation, but the public was neither informed nor knowledgeable about the risks. Even though predetermined tolerances for exposure to radioactivity were exceeded, "project staff did not call for evacuations or protective measures." A researcher for the Bulletin of the Atomic Scientists said that "Exposure rates in public areas from the world's first nuclear explosion were measured at levels 10,000 times higher than currently allowed." A monitoring team at Carrizozo, 35 miles (56 km) from the blast site and beneath the radiation cloud, reported at 4:20 pm on July 16 that the radiation level was too high to be measured on the survey meter. Evacuation of the town was considered, but the radiation cloud passed over quickly.

After the Trinity test, radioactive ash from the explosion fell from the sky for days. In Ruidoso, 50 miles (80 km) from the blast site, white flakes began falling on a group of 12 teenage campers a few hours after the explosion. The falling flakes looked like snow, but were hot, and the children played among them. Barbara Kent, thirteen years old at the time, was one of only two of this group to survive past the age of 40. Tina Cordova's family lived in Tularosa, also 50 miles (80 km) from the blast site. She reported that six members of her immediate family developed cancer after the Trinity test. Data provided by the New Mexico Department of Health to LANL in 1948 indicated a sharp rise in the infant mortality rate in New Mexico in 1945, compared with previous and subsequent years (100.8 deaths per 1,000 live births in 1945, compared with 89.1 in 1944, 78.2 in 1946, and 67.9 in 1947).

The heaviest fallout measured was at a place dubbed "Hot Canyon", 20 miles (32 km) northeast of the bomb site. The dose on the ground there totalled 139 rad over a two-week period, which is Category Four on the CDC's Radiation Hazard Scale (likely to cause illness but not death in unprotected people). The fallout in Hot Canyon was observed to settle in a white mist onto some of the livestock in the area, resulting in local beta burns and a temporary loss of hair. Patches of hair grew back discolored white. The Army bought 88 cattle from ranchers; the 17 most significantly affected were kept at Los Alamos while the rest were shipped to Oak Ridge for long-term observation. Several other sites northeast of the blast site in an area 12 miles (19 km) long and one mile wide had radioactive levels in Category 3 of the Radiation Hazard Scale which indicates an "increased risk of cancer". A 2023 study led by Sébastien Philippe argued that the fallout affected as many as 46 states, Canada, and Mexico.

The five New Mexico counties most impacted by radiation were Socorro, Lincoln, Guadalupe, San Miguel, and Torrance which had a combined population of about 65,000 in the mid-1940s. A 2020 study by the National Cancer Institute cited those counties as most at risk and said that several hundred cancers, primarily thyroid cancer, were probably caused by the blast and more were likely in the future. The study also cited "great uncertainty" about the completeness of its findings due to poor and limited data. For example, New Mexico only began collecting information on cancer in 1966 and some cancers developed much quicker than that after radiation exposure and might have occurred without attribution to the nuclear test.

== Legal issues ==
New Mexicans impacted or possibly impacted by the Trinity test were not included in the 1990 Radiation Exposure Compensation Act (RECA). That act authorized lump sum payments of $50,000 to "downwinders" (people downwind from the nuclear test) and suffering from several designated cancers possibly caused by nuclear tests in Nevada. By 2015, $2 billion had been paid claimants. New Mexican "downwinders" were not included in the law. In 2005, Tina Cordova, whose parents and grandparents suffered from cancers possibly attributable to the Trinity bomb, founded the Tularosa Basin Downwinders Consortium to lobby the US government for compensation and an apology. New Mexican lawmakers attempted to have New Mexican downwinders included in the law, but in 2024 Speaker of the House Mike Johnson declined to consider an extension of RECA and the law expired.

== Sources ==
- Hacker, Barton C. (1987). The Dragon's Tail: Radiation Safety in the Manhattan Project, 1942–1946. Berkeley: University of California Press. ISBN 0-520-05852-6. OCLC 13794117.
- Szasz, Ferenc Morton (1984). The Day the Sun Rose Twice: The Story of the Trinity Site Nuclear Explosion, July 16, 1945. Albuquerque: UNM Press. ISBN 0-8263-0768-X. OCLC 10779209.
