= DPF =

DPF may refer to:

- Dabalorivhuwa Patriotic Front, a South African political party
- Defence Police Federation, a British Police union
- Dense plasma focus, machine producing extremely hot, dense plasma
- Departamento de Polícia Federal, the Brazilian federal police
- Derna Protection Force, a Libyan rebel group
- Diesel particulate filter, that removes particulates from exhaust
