= Compensation scheme for radiation-linked diseases =

Workers compensation scheme

The Compensation scheme for radiation-linked diseases is a no-fault workers compensation scheme set-up by agreement between the nuclear site license holders and their workers trades unions. It was established in November 1982 by British Nuclear Fuels Limited and its trade unions following legal actions brought against the company by nuclear industry workers in the late 1970s. At the time of its establishment, BNFL and its trade unions agreed that the causation of cancer by radiation was sufficiently well understood that "it should be possible to construct a scheme which would evaluate the probability that a diagnosed cancer may have been caused by radiation exposure at work." Initially the scheme only accepted claims in which a worker had died from a radiation-linked disease. In 1987 this was expanded to allow morbidity claims. The list of participating member employers and trade unions has grown through the 1990s and 2000s. There have been 1823 cases considered/received since the Scheme began. 202 of these cases have resulted in successful claims. Compensation payments exceeding £8.90 million have been paid to claimants.

== Eligibility ==
In order to be eligible for compensation, a worker must have been employed by a listed company, have received an occupational radiation dose and belong to a trade union or have been a member at the time of the qualifying radiation exposure. For compensation the claimant must have developed cancer in any of 16 tissues/organs covered by the scheme (bladder, breast, bone, brain and central nervous system, uterus, colon, liver, oesophagus, lung, prostate, ovary, skin, thyroid, leukaemia and non-specific other tissue sites. The scheme also covers the development of some radiogenic cataracts. Some diseases are excluded on the basis that there is no convincing epidemiological evidence to link them with ionising radiation exposure. Excluded diseases include: Hodgkin's disease, hairy cell leukaemia, chronic lymphatic leukaemia (CLL), melanoma and mesothelioma.

=== Eligible employers ===
Employer	Website
United Kingdom Atomic Energy Authority	www.uk-atomic-energy.org.uk
Inutec Ltd	www.tradebe.com/environmental-services/services/nuclear-waste-decommissioning-services
URENCO UK Ltd	www.urenco.com/global-operations/urenco-uk
URENCO Chem Plants	www.urenco.com/global-operations/urenco-chemplants
URENCO Nuclear Stewardship	www.urenco.com/global-operations/urenco-nuclear-stewardship
EDF Energy Nuclear Generation Ltd (formerly British Energy Generation Ltd)	www.edfenergy.com/energy
Ministry of Defence	www.gov.uk/government/organisations/ministry-of-defence
Atomic Weapons Establishment	www.awe.co.uk
Devonport Royal Dockyard Ltd (DRDL)Marine and Technology Division, Babcock International Group	www.babcock.co.uk
Rosyth Royal Dockyard Ltd (RRDL) Marine and Technology Division, Babcock International Group	www.babcock.co.uk
Babcock Marine (Clyde) Ltd	www.babcock.co.uk
GE HealthCare Ltd	www.gehealthcare.co.uk
Sellafield Ltd (formerly British Nuclear Fuels / British Nuclear Group)	www.gov.uk/government/organisations/sellafield-ltd
Nuclear Restoration Services Ltd (including Dounreay Site Restoration Ltd)	https://www.gov.uk/government/organisations/nuclear-restoration-services
Springfields Fuels Ltd	www.westinghousenuclear.com/springfields
Nuclear Waste Services (formerly Drigg and LLWR)	www.gov.uk/government/organisations/nuclear-waste-services

=== Member Trade Unions ===
In 1982, trade union members of the scheme included Transport and General Workers Union, Institution of Professional Civil Servants, Amalgamated Engineering Union, GMB and PCS. Other trades unions joined as the scheme expanded. Later members include the EETPU and MSF, UCATT, Engineers and Managers Association, Unison, the First Division Association of Civil Servants, the AEA Constabulary Federation (now the Civil Nuclear Police Federation) and the Defence Police Federation.

The current Trade unions are

Trade Union	website
Civil Nuclear Police Federation	www.civilnuclearpolicefederation.org.uk
Defence Police Federation	www.dpf.org.uk
The First Division Association	www.fda.org.uk
GMB	www.gmb.org.uk
The Public and Commercial Services Union PCS	www.pcs.org.uk
Prospect	www.prospect.org.uk
Unison	www.unison.org.uk
UNITE (formerly Amicus, TGWU. Includes members of UCATT who merged with UNITE 1 January 2017)	www.unitetheunion.org

== Technical Basis ==
The scheme reflects the latest scientific/technical knowledge in the assessment of causation probability. New schedules according to the diagnosis of cancer were introduced in 2009 based on the risk algorithms in two internationally accepted reports - the Biological Effects of Ionising Radiation report of the US National Research Council (known as the BEIR VII report) and the 2006 report of the United Nations Scientific Committee on the Effects of Atomic Radiation (known as UNSCEAR). The technical basis of the scheme is kept under constant review.”

== Claiming compensation ==
Claims may be lodged by the worker, his or her wife, husband or partner (including same sex), the worker's "first line children" (those born to or legally adopted by the claimant). Once diagnosed with or deceased from an eligible disease, the worker or surviving family members have 30 years in which to make a claim. Claims may be made through the worker’s trade union, or on-line, by post or telephone. Once made, claims are assessed on consideration of medical, employment and dosimetry histories and data. These are used to calculate the probability that the cancer could have been caused by occupational exposure to radiation.

== Payments ==
The payment received following a successful claim varies depending on the actual loss (in earnings and pension) suffered by the claimant and sums for pain and suffering, loss of amenity and number of dependents. The level of payment awarded to a claimant (or estate if deceased) is determined by the "causation probability". The greater the causation probability, the greater the payment. Top tier payments are awarded if the causation probability is 50% or more. “ Essential features of the scheme are that it is more generous and quicker than for a case taken through the court system. Payments are made as low a causation probability of 20% whereas 50% causation probability is normally required in court. The Scheme publishes an Annual statement which is approved by the Scheme Council. The report includes a paragraph updating the number of claims and payments awarded.

There have been 1823 cases considered/received since the Scheme began. 202 of these cases have resulted in successful claims. Compensation payments exceeding £8.90 million have been paid to claimants.
