= San Antonio Film Festival =

SAFILM - San Antonio Film Festival
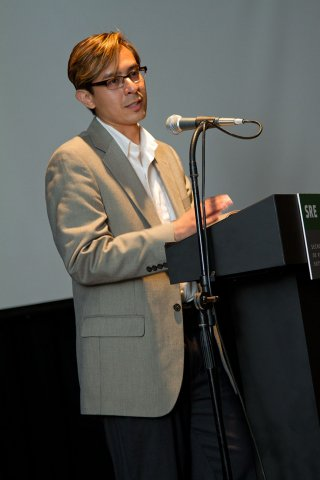
- SAFILM Executive Director Adam Rocha
- Location: San Antonio, TX, U.S.
- No. of films: 145
- Language: English and international
- Website: http://www.safilm.com/

The San Antonio Film Festival (SAFILM) was founded in 1994 by Adam Rocha as a video festival. It was later renamed the San Antonio Underground Film Festival and then finally the San Antonio Film Festival. It is now the biggest film festival in South Texas.

The non-profit festival is held each summer at the Tobin Center for the Performing Arts. Its mission is to serve as an accessible and inclusive platform for artists in the category of cinema and provide cinematic culture to a diverse audience.

The 22nd annual SAFILM was held July 25–31, 2016. 145 films were screened, including a local premiere of Hell or High Water, starring Jeff Bridges, Chris Pine, and San Antonio actor Gil Birmingham, who attended the screening. The festival awarded its 2016 Lifetime Achievement Award to Marcia Nasatir, a San Antonio native and the first woman to become Vice-President of Production at a major motion picture studio (United Artists) in 1974.

== History ==
After his sophomore year at San Antonio College, Adam Rocha was invited to screen his short film at the San Diego Latino Film Festival in California. The experience inspired him to organize his own film festival. In 1994, the first festival screened a dozen films and awarded low-rider bikes to the best picture.

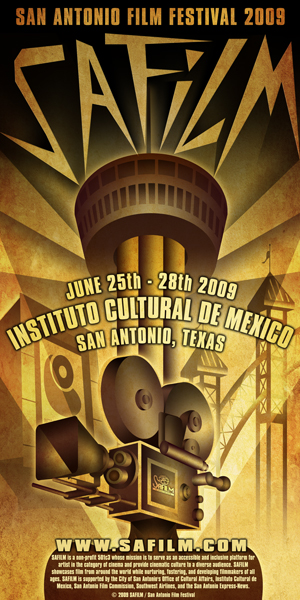
2009 official SAFILM poster by Rigoberto Luna

That year, Fredrick Weiss, the founder of the Texas Music Coalition, encouraged Rocha to develop the festival into a more substantial event. Renamed “The San Antonio Underground Film Festival,” the small festival expanded over the next five years into an event that attracted wider participation, larger audiences, and greater news coverage.

The non-profit's mission statement still drives the organization: “to offer an accessible and inclusive platform for artists and to provide cinematic culture to a diverse audience,” while maintaining a sociable, community-centered atmosphere. For several years, the historic Instituto Cultural de México partnered with the festival to provide a venue.

In 2006, the organization adopted its current name.

In 2016, the festival joined forces with the Historic Pearl to offer the first SAFILM – San Antonio Children's Film Festival at the Pearl Studio.

In 2023, the festival returned for its 29th year, screening over 200 films in six days at three locations.

Throughout the year, SAFILM volunteers encourage students to appreciate the arts and become involved in filmmaking by visiting high schools to give guest lectures. The festival itself helps students begin film careers, highlights outstanding filmmakers with a variety of awards, exposes rising talent, and reminds the public of the value of art.

Since its inception, SAFILM has also showcased local visual artists. Artists Mig Kokinda, James Cobb, Robert Tatum and Rigoberto Luna are among those who have designed festival posters. The 2009 SAFILM poster created by Rigoberto Luna was selected as a finalist for the 39th annual Hollywood Reporter Key Art Awards for Theatrical Print - Festival Posters.

== Awards ==
2026 SAFILM Award winners

- Best High School Filmmaker: Charlie McGeehan, "Murder Gum and Fly Fishing"
- San Antonio High School Filmmaker Award: Courtney King, "Heartstrings"

2025 SAFILM Award winners

- MARCIA NASATIR AWARD - EXCELLENCE IN CINEMA: Elizabeth Avellán
- TEXAS YANAGUANA AWARD: Shaquille O’Neal
- PATRON OF CINEMA ARTS:Officer Andy Adams
- RHYTHM REVOLUTION AWARD: Angel Miranda
- GRAND PRIZE: "First Friday", Director: Joshua Ojeda
- Jury Prize for Best Narrative Short: "Money Talks", Director: Tony Mucci
- Jury Prize for Best Female Performance: Tamsin Greig, "Legend Has It"
- Jury Prize for Best Actor: Logan Pepper, "Lovebug"
- Jury Prize for Best Historical Documentary: "First We Bombed New Mexico", Director: Lois Lipman
- Jury Prize for Best Documentary Short: "The Human Side Of Plastic: Babacar Thiaw",Directors: Andrew Lynch, Ben Ayers, Rush Sturges
- Jury Prize for Best Animated Short: "INKED", Director: Annamarie Alvarez
- Jury Prize for Best Music Video: "Precious", Director: Adrian Sutherland
- Best Narrative Feature: "Compatriots", Director: Spenser Cohen
- Best Emerging Filmmaker (Best College Film): "The Non-Biological Mexican", Director: Joseph Balderas
- Best Food Film: "Pieowa", Director: Beth M. Howard
- Best Screenplay: "A.I. Dad", Writer: Alex Avila
- Best Short Script: "Sacred Animals", Writers: Myles Brewer, Sofia Rubin
- Best Children’s Film: "BRIDGE - My Little Friends", Director: Kazuyuki Ishihara
- Best Series: "Wooden Spoons", Director: Tasneem Afridi
- Best Documentary Feature: "Ugly Little Monkeys", Directors: David E Valdez, Enrique Castillo
- Best San Antonio Filmmaker: Zach Goodwin, "Stitched"
- Best High School Filmmaker: Cynthia Cai, "Echoes of Silk and Tides: An Ethnic Introspection"
- San Antonio High School Filmmaker Award: Sawyer Beach, "I’m Home"

2024 SAFILM Award winners

- GRAND PRIZE: "Los Frikis", Directors: Michael Schwartz, Tyler Nilson
- Actor in a leading role: Héctor Medina, "Los Frikis"
- Actress in a leading role: Selma Egrei, "Port-au-Prince"
- BEST DOCUMENTARY: "RHINO MAN", Directors: John Jurko II, Matt Lindenberg, Daniel Roberts
- BEST NARRATIVE SHORT: "The Masterpiece", Director: Àlex Lora
- BEST DOCUMENTARY SHORT: "Fábrica de Arte Américas", Director: Cynthia Cazañas Garin
- BEST ANIMATED SHORT: "Ameka and Her Magical Crown", Director: Dr. Tamecca Rogers
- BEST CHILDREN’S FILM: "Color of Autumn", Director: Aimiende Negbenebor Sela
- BEST MUSIC VIDEO: "Déjà vu", Director: Jonathan Darius Bonner & Manuel Garcia
- BEST COLLEGE FILM: "American Body", Director: Juan Zuloaga Eslait
- BEST HIGH SCHOOL FILM: "On the Paths Awakened", Director: Axel Dahan
- BEST SAN ANTONIO FILM: "The Mummy Murders", Director: Colin Bressler
- BEST FEATURE SCREENPLAY: "Hospice", Writers: Paul Gonzales, Todd Biggerstaff
- BEST SHORT SCREENPLAY: "Wet Rot", Writer: Stuart Creque
- BEST FOOD FILM: "NAGAATTI", Director: Barento Taha

2023 SAFILM Award winners

- Jury Prize for Best Historical Documentary: "The Raaby Mystery", Director: Stian Indrevoll
- Grand Prize: Out There: "A National Parks Story", Director: Brendan Hall
- Best Narrative Feature: "The Great Distance Delivers Crane", Director: Lhapal Gyal
- Jury Prize for Best Documentary Short: "Python Huntress Directors Nicholas Orris", Matt Deblinger
- Jury Prize for Best Animated Short: "The Torrential Melody", Director: José Luis Saturno
- Jury Prize for Best Music Video: "Dirt Don’t Hurt", Director: Orlando Torres
- Best High School Filmmaker: "Well-Dying", Director: Junhyeok Kim
- Best Food Film: "Terroir to Table" Director: Rasmus Dinesen
- Best Screenplay: "Grynszpan/Thompson" Writer: Hal LaCroix
- Jury Prize for Best Performance: Jacki Von Preysing for "American Meltdown"
- Best Children’s Film: "The Squonk", Director: Mike Bonthe
- Best Series: "Puncher’s Chance", Directors: Garland Scott, Johnny Rey Diaz
- Jury Prize for Best Narrative Short: "The Last Dinner" Director: Marie-Ange Casalta
- Best Documentary Feature: "Immediate Family" Director: Danny Tedesco
- Jury Prize for Best Performance: Joshua Koopman for "Earlybird"
- Best Emerging Filmmaker: "Strings" Director: Rodrigo Moreno Fernandez
- Best San Antonio Filmmaker: "Black is Beautiful", Director: Marco Antonio Ortega
- San Antonio High School Filmmaker Award: "Memento Mori" Director: Ines Wallisch
- Best College Film: "The Student Film", Director: Brandon Herrera
- Best Short Script: "That’s So Gay" Writer: Dr. Tamecca Rogers
- Marcia Nasatir Award: Jennifer Petrini
- The Supporter of Cinema Arts Award: Roberto Soto

2022 SAFILM Award winners

- Lifetime Achievement Award: Editor Michael Jablow
- Best Short Script: "Runners", Writer Eric Coomes
- Best San Antonio Filmmaker: "Dream Carriers", Director: Esmeralda Hernandez
- Best Screenplay: "The Faerie Rings", By. Zina Brown
- Grand Prize: "The Pink Lagoon", Directors: Juan Are & Francisco Gallo
- Best Food Film: "Backstreet To The American Dream", Director: Patricia Nazario
- San Antonio High School Filmmaker Award: "GONE", Director: Kyle Ward
- Best Children's Film: "Duet", Director: Yadid Hirschtritt Licht
- Best Actress in a Leading Role:"The Pink Lagoon", Mόnica Are Victoria
- Best Emerging Filmmaker: "You're Now Beyond Hope, Arizona", Director: Nick Dugan
- Best High School Filmmaker: "Righteous Walk", Director: Harper Sharpe
- Best Documentary feature: "Deep in the Heart", Director: Ben Masters
- Jury Prize for Best Historical Documentary: "The Assassination & Mrs. Paine", Director: Max Good
- Jury Prize for Best Documentary Short: "805 Presents: A letter to Aptos", Director: Brendan Lutes
- Audience Award for Best Narrative Feature: "Colineales", Directors: Jose Raul Correa, Fabian Correa, Patricia Corres & Isle De Hoyos
- Jury Prize for Best Performance: "The Last Deal" Anthony Molinari
- Jury Prize for Best Animated Short: "Final Deathtination", Director: Marika Tamura
- Audience Award for Best Documentary Feature: "Backstreet To The American Dream", Director: Patricia Nazario
- Jury Prize for Best Narrative Short: "Divertimento", Director Keyvan Sheikhalishahi
- Jury Prize for Best Music Video: "Angel", Directors: Shannon Greer, Carl Quinn
- The Supporter of Cinema Arts Award: Scot Power

The 2021 Official Feature Selections include:

- Celeb Feature: "The Subject", Director: Lanie Zipoy

Jason Biggs (American Pie, Orange Is The New Black) character takes a dramatic turn as a successful white documentary filmmaker dealing with fallout from his last film, which caught the murder of a Black teenager on tape.

- Award-Winning Doc: "My Father’s Brothers", Director: Shawn Kelley

Award-winning documentary chronicling eight survivors of a horrific battle during the Vietnam War.

Q&A with three veterans after the screening: Bill, Woody Davis, and Bubber Fishburne Trailer: https://vimeo.com/421978193

- Jury Prize: "Show Me What You Got!", Director: Svetlana Cvetko

Richly filmed in black and white on the cityscape of Los Angeles, three young millennials meet by chance, form a whole-hearted ménage à trois and subtly challenge social norms surrounding love, sex and questioning.

- Local Filmmaker: "The Good Wolf", Director: Wilfred H. Shipley

Made on a micro-budget ($10k), this coming-of-age story stars Vic Trevino (Pee-wee's Playhouse, American Me) as James, a fugitive with an unknown past hiding in the woods, who meets Sam, a 12-year-old boy and his treehouse. Filmmakers in attendance.

- Horror Flick: "Blinders", Director: Tyler Savage

A man's life turns into a living nightmare when he befriends an unstable rideshare driver who becomes obsessed with him. Filmmakers in attendance.

“We’re returning to our roots,” says SAFILM Founder and Executive Director Adam Rocha, who celebrated last year’s 26th annual festival virtually due to the pandemic. “It’s time to bring back the intimate screenings, safely, like we did in the old days, and celebrate our filmmakers who were cheated from showcasing their work to a REAL audience.”

2020 SAFILM-SAN ANTONIO FILM FESTIVAL WINNERS

- Grand Prize: Show Me What You Got, Director Svetlana Cvetko
- Jury Prize for Best Performance: The Subject, Director Lanie Zipoy
- Jury Prize for Best Narrative Short: The Shot, Director Adan Canto
- Jury Prize for Best Documentary Short: From Beacon to the Border, Director Andrea Garbarini
- Jury Prize for Best Historical Documentary: Beethoven in Beijing, Directors Jennifer Lin & Sharon Mullally
- Jury Prize for Best Animated Short: King of the House, Director Zige Zhang
- Jury Prize for Best Music Video: Home?, Director Helena Giersz
- Best College Filmmaker: The 11th Order, Director Joshua DeFour
- Best High School Filmmaker: Instinct, Director Yinuo Wei
- Best San Antonio Filmmaker: The Good Wolf, Director Wilfred Shipley
- Best Actress in a Leading Role: Eileen Weisinger, Woodford County
- Best Short Script: Replaceable Parts, Writer Vance Berk
- Best Screen Play: The Quicksilver Pleasure Club, Writer Matt Pacini
- Best Food Film: The Sense of Cocoa, Director Alberto Utrera
- Best CHILDREN'S Film: Circus Sam, Director Rayner Wang

2020 AUDIENCE CHOICE WINNERS

WINNER - Audience Award for Best Narrative Feature The Good Wolf, directed by Wilfred H Shipley Synopsis: Made on a micro-budget (10k). The Good Wolf is a coming of age story about a fugitive named James played by Vic Trevino (Pee-wee's Playhouse, American Me) with an unknown past hiding in the woods. There, he comes across a treehouse, where he meets Sam, a 12-year-old boy. The two become an unlikely pair of friends and spend the summer together surviving and learning from one another. As the summer comes to an end, police begin to get closer to finding James's whereabouts, leaving James with limited options for survival.

WINNER - Audience Award for Best Documentary Feature My Father's Brothers directed by Shawn Kelley Synopsis: The filmmaker interviewed his father and seven survivors of a horrific battle in the jungles of Vietnam in 1966. Following ill-conceived orders, one of the company's platoons is blindsided by Vietcong forces. Separated from the other platoons and far from rescue, they suffer an intense battle that would forever shape each of their lives.

2019 SAFILM-SAN ANTONIO FILM FESTIVAL WINNERS

- 2019 SAFILM Short Screenplay Winner: “Songbird on the Wire” by Vance Berk
- 2019 SAFILM Feature Screenplay Winner: “An Undocumented Rumor” by Philip C. Sedgwick
- 2019 SAFILM Best Performance in a Leading Role: "One Day Notice" Adam Lopez
- 2019 SAFILM Jury Prize for Best Narrative Short: “Yes, But No” (“Si Pero No”) Directed by Maria Dioni
- 2019 SAFILM Jury Prize for Best Documentary Short: “25 Texans in the Land of Lincoln” Director Ellen Brodsky
- 2019 SAFILM Jury Prize for best Historical Feature Documentary: “Red Dog” Directors Casey Pinkston and Luke Dick
- 2019 SAFILM Jury Prize for Best Animated Short: “The Admin: Episode 1 - Healthy Choices vs the Breakfast Taco” Director Robert B Gonzales
- 2019 SAFILM Jury Prize for Best Music Video: “Subterranean” by Francis Trachta & Chus Sarrión
- 2019 SAFILM Jury Prize Best College Filmmaker: “Cake” Director Esmeralda Hernandez
- 2019 SAFILM Jury Prize Best High School Filmmaker: “Sincerely Anthony” Director Max Shoham
- 2019 SAFILM Jury Prize Best San Antonio Filmmaker: “Heart of Gold” Director: Joel Cavazos
- 2019 SAFILM Jury Prize, Best Actress in a Leading Role: “Ginger” Susan Gordon
- 2019 SAFILM DIRECTORS CUT AWARD: "The Cat and The Moon", Director Alex Wolff

2018 SAFILM Award winners

- Short Screenplay winner: “Forever Waiting”, by: Gavin O'Herlihy
- Feature Screenplay winner: “John Horse”, by: Walt Alexander and James Riordan
- Grand Prize: “Stella’s Last Weekend”, Director: Polly Draper
- Best Performance in a Leading Role: "Valentina", Victoria Del Rosal
- Jury Prize for Best Narrative Short: “Unlucky’s Luck”, Director: Felipe Holguin
- Jury Prize for Best Documentary Short: “Do or Die”, Director: Dan Klores
- Jury Prize for best Historical Feature Documentary: “Fail State”, Directors: Alexander Shebanow
- Jury Prize Best Historical Short: “Towards the Sun”, Director: Monica Santis
- Jury Prize for Best Animated Short: “Weekends”, Director: Trevor Jimenez
- Jury Prize Best Narrative Feature: “The Darkest Days of Us”, Director: Astrid Rondero
- Jury Prize Best College Filmmaker: “The Letter”, Director: Jazmin Aguilar
- Jury Prize Best High School Filmmaker: “Catman: The Love Thief”, Director: Austin Coombs-Perez
- Jury Prize Best San Antonio Filmmaker: “Tia Chuck”, Director: Angela Walley & Mark Walley
- Jury Prize Best Actress in a Leading Role: “The Butterfly Tree”, Melissa George
- Legacy Award: Actor and Director Jesse Borrego
- Lifetime Achievement Award: Producer Fred Roos
- Audience Award for Best Narrative Feature: Colossal Youth, Director: Scott Leisk
- Audience Award for Best Documentary Feature: HERMANOS, Director: Laura Plancarte

2017 SAFILM Award winners

- Grand Prize: Silverfish, Director: Matthew Thorton
- Jury Prize for Best Narrative Short: It was Nice to Meet You, Director: Kaicey Chae
- Jury Prize for Best Documentary Short: Refugee, Director: Joyce Chen & Emily Moore
- Jury Prize for Best Animated Short: Journey, Director: Radheya Jegatheva
- Jury Prize for Best College Filmmaker: Mind Your Body, Director: Silke C. Engler
- Jury Prize for Best High School Filmmaker: Three Tales of a Coin, Director Nishok Nishok
- Jury Prize for Best San Antonio Filmmaker: #prayfor, Director Dave Sims
- Jury Prize for Best Historical/Feature Documentary: Daughters of the Curved Moon, Director: Miranda Morton Yap & Sophie Dia Pegrum
- Jury Prize for Best Narrative Feature: I Am Still Here, Director: Mischa Marcus
- Best Short Screenplay: The Minutiae, by Dean Friske
- Best Feature Screenplay: The Clever Girl, by David Carren
- Lifetime Achievement Award: Harry J. Ufland

2016 SAFILM Award winners

- Grand Prize: Mile End, Director: Graham Higgins
- Jury Prize for Best Narrative Short: Morgue, Director: Laurent Prim
- Jury Prize for Best Documentary Short: Looking for Trouble, Director: Caroline Cuny & Bryan Campbell
- Jury Prize for Best Animated Short: One Day on Carver Street, Director: Azure Allen
- Jury Prize for Best College Filmmaker: Zaar, Director: Ibrahim Nada
- Jury Prize for Best High School Filmmaker: The 1% Crisis in the Great Lakes, Director Griffin Olis
- Jury Prize for Best San Antonio Filmmaker: Birth of a Killer, Director Daniel Maldonado
- Jury Prize for Best Historical/Feature Documentary: Until 20, Director: Jamila Paksima & Geraldine Moriba
- Jury Prize for Best Narrative Feature: Second Impression, Director: Wallace Weatherspoon
- Jury Prize for Best Documentary Feature: Brewed in the 210, Director: Marco Ortega
- Jury Prize for Best Performance: Kaveh Kavian in Zaar
- Jury Prize for Best Actress in a Leading Role: Fabienne Hollwege in Morgue
- Best Short Screenplay: Before the Bomb, by Tannaz Hazemi & James Grimaldi
- Best Feature Screenplay: The Changer, by J. Motos Gordon
- Supporter of Cinema Arts Award: Guerrero CPA Principal- Mr. Ed Guerrero
- Lifetime Achievement Award: Marcia Nasatir

2014 SAFILM Award winners

- Grand Prize: 3:13, Director: David Jaure
- Jury Prize for Best Performance: Kathleen Chalfant, Isn't It Delicious
- Jury Prize for Narrative Short: Fade, Director: Parish Rahbar
- Jury Prize for Best Documentary Short: Kings of BBQ Barbecue Kuwait, Director: John Markus
- Jury Prize for Best Animated Short: Driven, Director: Michael Zachary Huber
- Best San Antonio Filmmaker: Fields Afire, Director: Will Underwood
- Best College Filmmaker: 113 Degrees, Director: Sabrina Doyle
- Best Independent Feature Film: The Wisdom to Know the Difference, Director: Daniel Baldwin
- Best High School Filmmaker: Creatures of the Hidden Realm, Director: Alexia Salingaros
- Best Feature Documentary: Jose Canseco: The Truth Hurts, Director: Bill McAdams
- Audience Choice Award for Best Documentary Feature: Jose Canseco: The Truth Hurts, Director: Bill McAdams
- Audience Choice Award for Best Narrative Feature: The Wisdom to Know the Difference, Director: Daniel Baldwin

2012 SAFILM Award winners

- Audience Award for Best Documentary Feature: Along Recovery, Director Justin Springer
- Audience Award for Best Narrative Feature: A Schizophrenic Love Story, Director Glenn Levy
- Grand Prize: Portion, Director Gisberg Bermudez, Producers Juan Villarreal, Adrian Falcon
- Jury Prize for Best Performance: David Diaan, Mossadegh
- Jury Prize for Best Narrative Short: Crescendo, Directed by Alonso Alvarez
- Jury Prize for Best Documentary Short: Innocente, Producer Albie Hecht
- Jury Prize for Best Animated Short: World’s Apart, Director Michael Zachary Huber
- Jury Prize for Best College Filmmaker: Children of the Air, Director Damian Horan
- Jury Prize for Best High School Filmmaker: Cardiac Arrest, Director Maqui Gaona
- Jury Prize for Best San Antonio Filmmaker: Lilia, Director Sam Lerma

2011 SAFILM Award winners

- Grand Prize: Crime After Crime, Director: Yoav Potash
- Jury Prize for Best College Filmmaker: After the Shearing, Director: Vanessa Rojas
- Jury Prize for Best High School Filmmaker: She is..., Director: Amber Cordova
- Jury Prize for Best San Antonio Filmmaker: Katrina’s Son, Director: Ya’Ke Smith
- Jury Prize for Best Narrative Short: Homecoming, Director: Lorian James Delman
- Audience Award for Best Narrative Feature: Beautiful Silence, Director: Jorge A. Jimenez
- Audience Award for Best Documentary Short: Operation: Hands On, Director: Gary Logan
- Audience Award for Best Documentary Feature: The Harvest, Director: U. Roberto Romano
- Audience Award for Best Animated Short: Martyris, Director: Luis Felipe Hernandez
- Audience Award for Best Performance: Beautiful Silence, Director: Jorge A. Jimenez

2010 SAFILM Award winners

- SAFILM Grand Prize - Twenty Five Hundred & One, Dir: Patricia Van Ryker
- SAFILM Jury Prize for Best Narrative Short - Efrain, Dir: Matthew Breault
- SAFILM Jury Prize for Best Documentary Short - the Last Elephants in Thailand, Donald R. Tayloe & Michelle Mizner
- SAFILM Jury prize for the Best Animated Short - Closed Zone, Dir: Yoni Goodman
- SAFILM Jury prize for the Best San Antonio Filmmaker - the Fall Of the House Of Usher, Dir: Eric Fonseca
- SAFILM Jury prize for the Best High School Filmmaker - No Pity, Dir: Drew Goldsmith
- SAFILM Jury Prize for Best College Filmmaker - Mashed, Dir: Adam Fisher
- SAFILM Jury Prize are for Best Performance in a Short - An Affair With Dolls, Alexandra Chalupa
- SAFILM Jury Prize Best Performance in a Feature - Fanny, Annie, & Danny, Jill Pixley
- SAFILM Audience Award for the Best Narrative Feature - Go For It!, Dir: Carmen Marron
- SAFILM Audience Award for Best Documentary Feature - Last Survivor, Dir: Michael Pertnoy

2009 Award winners

- SAFILM Grand Prize - Funeral March for a Marionette, Dir: Eric Fonseca
- SAFILM Jury Prize for Best Performance - Cruzando, Michael Ray Escamilla
- SAFILM Jury Prize for Best Narrative Short - La Tangente, Dir: Vincent Vesco
- SAFILM Jury Prize for Best Documentary Short - In His Blood, Dir: Vianna Davila
- SAFILM Jury Prize for Best Animated Short - Funeral March for a Marionette, Dir: Eric Fonseca
- SAFILM Best High School Filmmaker - La Memoria de Amor, Dir: Andie C. Flores
- SAFILM Best San Antonio Filmmaker - Death Rattle, Dir: A. J. Garces
- SAFILM Audience Award for Best Narrative Feature - Doctor "S" Battles the Sex Crazed Reefer Zombies, Dir: Bryan Ortiz
- Audience Award for Best Documentary Feature - Beyond the Call, Dir: Adrian Belic

2008 Award winners

- SAFILM Grand Prize - Adventures of Power, Dir: Ari Gold
- SAFILM Auteur Award - Crawford, Dir: David Modigliani
- SAFILM Auteur Award - Reborn: New Orleans Schools, Dir: Drea Cooper

2007 Award winners

- SAFILM Grand Prize – Get Thrashed: The Story of Thrash Metal, Dir: Rick Ernst
- SAFILM Indie Auteur Awards – Zombie Love, Dir: Yfke van Berckelaer
- SAFILM Indie Max – Tijuana Makes Me Happy, Dir: Dylan Verrechia
