= Divine Strake =

Cancelled American weapons test

Divine Strake was the official designation for a large-yield, non-nuclear, high-explosive test that was planned for the Nevada National Security Site, formerly the Nevada Test Site. Following its announcement, the test generated great controversy, centering on two issues: its potential value in developing a nuclear "bunker buster" warhead, and the possibility that the mushroom cloud generated by the explosion could carry large amounts of radioactive dust deposited at the Test Site over years of nuclear testing.

On February 22, 2007, the Defense Threat Reduction Agency (DTRA) officially cancelled the experiment.

== Background and controversy ==
The test was originally scheduled for June 2, 2006, at the site of an existing tunnel in the United States Department of Energy Nevada Test Site. It was first postponed until September 2006 as the result of a lawsuit filed on behalf of Native American and environmental groups concerned that the explosion could thrust into the atmosphere nuclear fallout from previous nuclear tests at the Test Site, and was later postponed even further to 2007.

In August 2006, a spokesperson for the Defense Threat Reduction Agency told the Las Vegas Review-Journal that a limestone quarry near Bedford, Indiana was under consideration as a possible alternative location for the test. Professor David Sanders, Democratic candidate for U.S. Representative for the 4th Congressional District of Indiana, organized efforts to oppose the test in Indiana. Michael Evenson of the Defense Threat Reduction Agency stated that the site in Indiana was no longer being considered on August 29, 2006. In mid-November, DTRA ended speculation that the test would be moved to New Mexico when the agency informed Sen. Pete Domenici, R-N.M., that environmental studies needed to move the Divine Strake test to the New Mexico missile range would delay the test too long and that the test would be held in Nevada.

In December 2006, the revision to the Environmental Assessment was released, and public meetings to be held by the Pentagon were announced for January. Although the study concluded that there were no health risks to persons outside the blast area, it did state that:

Since suspended natural radionuclides and resuspended fallout radionuclides from the detonation have potential to be transported off of the NTS by wind, they may contribute radiological dose to the public.

The test would have utilized 700 tons of ANFO (ammonium nitrate + fuel oil) explosive, which is equivalent to 593 tons of TNT. According to a draft environmental impact assessment filed by the National Nuclear Security Administration in May 2006, the charge would have been placed at 37.02361°N 116.18377°W in a circular pit some 32 feet in diameter with a hemispherical bottom. The center of gravity of the charge would have been at least 20 feet below ground level.

Some media reports have stated that the purpose of Divine Strake was to test the ability of a conventional explosive to penetrate underground military compounds. However, other reports suggested that this explanation was not credible given the weight, dimensions and emplacement of the charge and that the program was designed to test the effects of a nuclear bunker buster on deeply buried tunnel structures. The organization immediately responsible for conducting the test, the Defense Threat Reduction Agency, stated:

The experiment is not being conducted in support of any specific existing or planned nuclear or conventional weapon. However, the data from DIVINE STRAKE and previous smaller explosive tests against the tunnel will be used to support improvement of computer modeling codes for predicting ground shock propagation and ground motion.

== Effects ==
The test is reminiscent of The Gadget test of 1945, and was expected to produce a mushroom cloud; however, this test would have been far smaller than the Minor Scale simulated nuclear explosion at White Sands Missile Range in 1985. The test, which would not have been visible from Las Vegas, was expected to shoot a cloud of debris 10,000 feet in the air and result in a 3.1- to 3.4-magnitude earthquake. A leading environmental consultant, Richard L. Miller, believes that six tests conducted in the 1950s may have spread contamination over the area where the Pentagon planned to detonate the explosives. The question of radioactive contamination was raised by two Utah legislators, Senator Orrin Hatch and Representative Jim Matheson, who asked for detailed mapping of the contamination surrounding the Divine Strake site.

== See also ==
- Bunker buster
- Downwinders
