= Radio Bikini =

American 1988 documentary film of 1946 nuclear test

- DVD cover
- Directed by: Robert Stone
- Produced by: Kevin Rafferty; Robert Stone
- Cinematography: John Rayter; Robert Stone
- Edited by: Robert Stone
- Distributed by: PBS
- Release date: June 10, 1988
- Running time: 56 minutes
- Country: United States
- Languages: English; Marshallese

Radio Bikini is a 1988 American documentary film directed by Robert Stone. It was nominated for an Academy Award in 1988 for Best Documentary Feature. It was later aired on the PBS series The American Experience.

== Summary ==
The film documents the nuclear tests performed around Bikini Atoll during Operation Crossroads in 1946, and their effects on the indigenous population and American servicemen involved.

== Interviewees ==
- Kilon Bauno (Chief of the Bikinians)
- John Smitherman, atomic veteran

== Production ==
The film was produced in-part by attorney Jonathan Weisgall. In 1975, he had been sent by Covington & Burling to meet with displaced Bikini Islanders from the 1946 atomic tests. He eventually published a book on the subject, “Operation Crossroads: The Atomic Tests at Bikini Atoll.”

== Reception ==
The Los Angeles Times wrote, “The film by British film maker Robert Stone (an Oscar nominee for feature documentary) is an outstanding achievement on all levels. Stone conveys an enormous body of facts, figures, attitudes and effects in the most organically subtle fashion. There’s also a uniquely emotional quality thanks to the participation of two witnesses--Kilon Bauno, the chief of 162 Bikinians who were relocated throughout the Marshall Islands to clear the way for the nuclear invaders, and John Smitherman, a Navy pilot involved in dropping the bombs.”

The Washington Post wrote, “Stone's film is an eloquent, if harrowing, examination of the psychic and physical fallout of the testing, both on Bikinians and on unprotected American servicemen who were drenched in radioactive mists while monitoring the blasts. The most surreal footage comes from government archives -- never-before- seen film shot for a propaganda epic that was never made. Seven hundred and fifty cameras and half the world's existing movie film were shipped to Bikini to capture the Felliniesque events. Men shear lambs, grease them with Flashpoint cream and strap them to the decks of "target" ships in the Bikini lagoon to test the effects of the blasts. There is footage of uncomprehending Bikinians leaving their home, of fresh-faced sailors walking, naked, into showers jokingly labeled "Radio Active," of military men hand-painting the name "Gilda" on a fat 20-kiloton bomb. It's all perky, upbeat—Beaver Cleaver Drops the Bomb.”

Michaela Pontellini wrote in Vancouver Weekly, “Radio Bikini, which is named for the temporary radio station positioned on the island shortly before Operation Crossroads began, is firmly against the destructive powers of nuclear energy. There are no interviews with anyone other than the victims of the disaster, and the focus is entirely on what is portrayed to be completely useless nuclear testing and the sheer callousness of the United States government for putting its servicemen at risk. Smitherman notes that none of the servicemen were informed as to what the tests were, nor the possible dangers of their involvement. The complete lack of consent is galling, and highlights the American governments decision to sacrifice a few for the ‘greater good’.”

== See also ==
- The Atomic Cafe - the 1982 collage documentary film co-directed by producer Kevin Rafferty
- Trinity and Beyond - the 1995 documentary film similar in content
