= Atomic veteran =

Soldier exposed to harmful amounts of radiation while on active duty

An atomic veteran is a veteran who was exposed to ionizing radiation while present in the site of a nuclear explosion during active duty. The U.S. Department of Veterans Affairs defines an atomic veteran "who, as part of his or her military service: Participated in an above-ground nuclear test, 1945–1962; or was part of the U.S. military occupation forces in/around Hiroshima/Nagasaki before 1946; or was held as a POW in or near Hiroshima or Nagasaki (certain cases)."

Atomic veterans also include service personnel from other nations, including the United Kingdom, Australia, New Zealand, France, China, and Russia, who were similarly exposed during their active service.

== United States ==
=== Recognition ===
On July 15, 2021, President Joe Biden issued a presidential proclamation declaring July 16, 2021, the 76th anniversary of the Trinity test, as "National Atomic Veterans Day".

=== Affected veterans ===
The Defense Threat Reduction Agency's Nuclear Test Personnel Review has maintained a database of participants and radiation dose reconstructions since 1978. Dose reconstructions are used by the United States Department of Veterans Affairs (VA) to evaluate and decide veterans' claims filed under the provisions of Public Law (PL) 98-542 and implementing regulations in Title 38 of the Code of Federal Regulations, part 3.311.

John Smitherman was a Navy sailor involved in the 1946 Bikini Atoll nuclear explosions, which resulted in extensive radioactive contamination of the area. Smitherman was diagnosed with lymphatic system cancer, underwent two leg amputations, and later became president of the National Association of Atomic Veterans. Smitherman was featured in Robert Stone's documentary film Radio Bikini, which was nominated for an Academy Award in 1988.

Multiple veterans unveiled first-hand accounts of above-ground nuclear tests in the short film directed by Morgan Knibbe. The veterans recall the traumatic experience of watching an atomic explosion occur only a few miles from their position. From their recounting of the story, the soldiers had no idea what they were being tested for until the bomb exploded. The group interviewed in the video was sent out in standard military gear, consisting of little more than a utility jacket, helmet, and gas mask. These men were sworn to secrecy or suffer a $10,000 fine or 10 years in prison and be left unsupported and uncompensated by the federal government for any radiation-related injury, death, or disability.

=== 1994 retrospective investigation ===
A formal investigation of the radiation exposure these veterans received, as well as radiation experiments conducted on humans, was initiated in 1994 by former President Bill Clinton, who apologized for their treatment in 1995. "In 1996, the U.S. Congress repealed the Nuclear Radiation Secrecy Agreement Act, which rescinded the Atomic Veteran "oath-of-secrecy", thus allowing Atomic-Veterans the opportunity to recount stories of their participation in nuclear weapon testing and post-test event activities, without legal penalty. By this time, however, many thousands of Atomic Veterans, the majority of whom were afflicted with a host of radiation-induced health issues, such as cancer, had taken that "secret" with them to their graves.

==== Compensation ====
The remaining atomic veterans may receive special priority enrollment for health care services from the VA for radiation-related conditions. In addition, atomic veterans are eligible to participate in an ionizing radiation registry examination program operated by the VA.

==== Loss of records and restriction of access to compensation ====
The only copies of service and medical records for many of these veterans were lost in a fire at the National Archives in 1973. Veterans, or families of deceased veterans, whose records were lost in the fire, were denied compensatory services and must go through an extensive reconstruction process to establish their presence during the time of atmospheric tests.

=== Current status of compensatory law ===
The United States Department of Justice (DOJ) has a different compensation program established by the Radiation Exposure Compensation Act (RECA), which the United States Congress passed on October 5, 1990, and signed into law by President George H. W. Bush on October 15. Atomic veterans who participated in atmospheric nuclear tests may be eligible. Through RECA, atomic veterans are labelled "Onsite Participants" and can qualify for up to $75,000 in compensation.

The Radiation Exposure Compensation Act was amended in 2013 and enlarged the geographic exposure area and the amount of compensation payable to Atomic Veterans and people living downwind of the tests. Other compensation may also be available from the United States Department of Labor under section SEC of the Energy Employees Occupational Illness Compensation Program.

Epidemiological studies of atomic veterans have shown exposure to radiation to be associated with several disorders including leukemia, various cancers and cataracts. It has been determined that studies on the children of atomic veterans, however, face "insurmountable" difficulties.

== France ==
A cohort of workers who were exposed during the French nuclear weapons test program at Moruroa Atoll from 1966 to 1996 are represented by Mururoa e Tatou. The organization has been critical of the French government's initial denial of harm and limited commitment to compensation, valued at $13.5 million. The president of the organization estimates that between 15,000 and 30,000 people worked on the test program, but the official number remains a national secret.

== Australia ==
Australian servicemen supported British nuclear weapons test programs at Emu Field, Maralinga, the Montebello Islands and Kiritimati (then called Christmas Island) from 1952 to 1963. Associations representing Australian atomic veterans include the Australian Nuclear Veterans Association and the Australian Ex-Servicemen Atomic Survivors Association.

=== Compensation ===
The Clarke Review of Veterans Entitlements considered the compensation of Australian atomic veterans in 2003. Since 2010, Australian Defence Force personnel who participated in the British nuclear tests have been eligible for compensation and health care benefits for medical conditions related to their service. Widows and widowers of deceased servicemen and women are also eligible for benefits if their partner's death is related to that service. A 'reasonable hypothesis' standard of proof is applied to all claims lodged.

== China ==
More than 100,000 Chinese troops were sent into the deserts of Xinjiang Uyghur Autonomous Region to provide construction labor for the Lop Nur Nuclear Test Base, where China's first atomic bombs were tested. A number of these troops later developed serious medical problems.

== See also ==
- Atomic bomb
- Downwinders
- Hibakusha
- Human experimentation in the United States
- Human radiation experiments
