= Sébastien Philippe (professor) =

American nuclear security specialist

- Education: Institut national des sciences appliquées (MS), Princeton University (PhD)
- Awards: MacArthur Fellowship (2025)
- Scientific career
- Fields: Nuclear security
- Workplaces: University of Wisconsin-Madison

Sébastien Philippe is a French academic and nuclear security specialist. He currently works as an assistant professor at the University of Wisconsin–Madison. He also serves on the United Nations Independent Scientific Panel on Effects of Nuclear War. He was awarded a MacArthur Fellowship in 2025.

== Biography ==
He received a Bachelors of Arts from Trinity College Dublin. He received a Masters of Science from the Institut national des sciences appliquées in Lyon in 2010. He also worked as a graduate fellow at IRSEM in France and served as a safety engineer for strategic nuclear forces in the Direction générale de l'armement. He graduated from Princeton with a PhD in 2018. He then worked as a postdoctoral fellow at Harvard Kennedy School in 2018 before becoming an associate faculty member at Sciences Po.

He became an Assistant Professor at the University of Wisconsin–Madison's Department of Nuclear Engineering in 2025. He also works as a visiting researcher at the Princeton School of Public and International Affairs.

He co-authored a book, Toxique, analyzing the results of French nuclear testing on islands in the South Pacific. It went on to be one of four shortlisted books for the Albert Londres Prize in 2021. That same year, he was nominated for Arms Control Person of the Year by the Arms Control Association.

He is a member of the Science Advisory Group of the International Campaign to Abolish Nuclear Weapons. On July 18, 2025, he was announced as a member of the United Nations Independent Scientific Panel on Effects of Nuclear War. He participated in his first meeting in September of that same year.

He was awarded a MacArthur Fellowship in 2025, which is also known as the "genius" grant. In 2025, he was also awarded the Joseph A. Burton Forum Award by the American Physical Society.

He has been known for his simulations of nuclear fallout: his project The Missiles On Our Land uses simulations to measure the risk to United States residents in case of nuclear war. He has stated that Wisconsin, where he resides, is in the potential path of fallout of four hundred or more nuclear silos.

In 2023, Phillippe published a study in which he served as lead author, finding that the Trinity fallout traveled far farther than expected, to 46 states, Canada, and Mexico. On July 10, 2026, Phillippe published a study, in which he served as lead author, finding that Los Alamos National Laboratory could have far more deadly effects should plutonium escape than anticipated: while the Department of State estimated one kilogram escaping as causing nine deaths, Phillippe estimated 3,200 cancer cases and 1,000 deaths, as well as more than a hundred billion dollars in land remediation.
