= Cover story =

Cover story or Cover Story may refer to:

- Cover Story (2000 film), a Malayalam-language film
- Cover Story (2002 film), an American film
- Cover Story (2011 film), a Hindi-language film
- Cover Story (TV series), an American documentary series which debuted in 2018
