= Downwinders =

Persons exposed to nuclear test fallout

Downwinders were individuals and communities, in the United States, in the intermountain West between the Cascade and Rocky Mountain ranges primarily in Arizona, Nevada, New Mexico, and Utah but also in Oregon, Washington, and Idaho who were exposed to radioactive contamination or nuclear fallout from atmospheric or underground nuclear weapons testing, and nuclear accidents. Although, when the term first originated, it mainly referred to the affected peoples near the Nevada Test Site (NTS), but the label has since expanded to include people experiencing negative effects of radiation in places outside of the United States borders like the Marshall Islands.

More generally, the term can also include those communities and individuals who are exposed to ionizing radiation and other emissions due to the regular production and maintenance of coal ash, nuclear weapons, nuclear power, nuclear waste, and geothermal energy. In regions near U.S. nuclear sites, downwinders may be exposed to releases of radioactive materials into the environment that contaminate their groundwater systems, food chains, and the air they breathe. Some downwinders may have suffered acute exposure due to their involvement in uranium mining and nuclear experimentation.

Several severe adverse health effects, such as an increased incidence of cancers, thyroid diseases, CNS neoplasms, and possibly female reproductive cancers that could lead to congenital malformations, have been observed in Hanford, Washington, "downwind" communities exposed to nuclear fallout and radioactive contamination. The impact of nuclear contamination on an individual is generally estimated as the result of the dose of radiation received and the duration of exposure, using the linear no-threshold model (LNT). Sex, age, race, culture, occupation, class, location, and simultaneous exposure to additional environmental toxins are also significant, but often overlooked, factors that contribute to the health effects on a particular "downwind" community.

Recent research has expanded the reach of the experience of the Downwinders to include the fallout following the Nevada Test Site nuclear testing in the 1950s, including the generational impacts, the ongoing contamination, and the delays of federal government acknowledgment of liability. Studies by such authors as Sarah Alisabeth Fox and Philip L. Fradkin show how the oral histories from the communities of the Western United States provide information on the prevalence of Thyroid disease, Leukemia, and Autoimmune disease. More recently, the history of the fallout, as shown by various environmental histories, indicates that it continues to impact the politics of Nuclear testing and compensation programs well into the 21st century.

== Nuclear testing ==
Between 1945 and 1980, the United States, the U.S.S.R., the United Kingdom, France and China exploded 504 nuclear devices in atmospheric tests at thirteen primary sites yielding the explosive equivalent of 440 megatons of TNT. Of these atmospheric tests, 330 were conducted by the United States. Accounting for all types of nuclear tests, official counts show that the United States has conducted 1,054 nuclear weapons tests to date, involving at least 1,151 nuclear devices, most of which occurred at Nevada Test Site and the Pacific Proving Grounds in the Marshall Islands, with ten other tests taking place at various locations in the United States, including Alaska, Colorado, Mississippi, and New Mexico. There have been an estimated 2,000 nuclear tests conducted worldwide; the number of nuclear tests conducted by the United States alone is currently more than the sum of nuclear testing done by all other known nuclear states (the USSR, United Kingdom, France, China, India, Pakistan, and North Korea) combined.

Historians have chronicled the fact that the earliest testing policy paradigms in the United States were predicated on the notion that areas of sparse population, such as the American West, could handle Nuclear testing, which assumption proved to be erroneous regarding Nuclear fallout dispersal. Blades and Siracusa establish that the government greatly underestimated atmospheric dispersal and radioactive plumes during the 1950s.

Other tests conducted elsewhere also led to increased exposure to the public. As J. Samuel Walker observes regarding Project Dribble in Mississippi, low-yield and underground tests were also capable of producing radiation and, consequently, health anxieties among the people.

Oral histories conducted by authors Fox and Fradkin tell of the settling of fallout on ranching, farming, and living areas in Nevada, Utah, Arizona, Idaho, and the province of New Mexico, often with little public notice. People remembered the ash-type fallout drifting over grazing lands, gardens, and water, which were to become pivotal to the anti-downwinder movement.

These nuclear tests infused vast quantities of radioactive material into the world's atmosphere, resulting in widely dispersed radiation and its subsequent deposition as global fallout.

=== Exposure ===
Aboveground nuclear explosions produce a characteristic mushroom cloud, which moves downwind as it reaches its stabilization height. Dispersion of the radioactive elements causes vertical and lateral cloud movement, spreading radioactive materials over adjacent regions. While the large particles settle nearby the site of the detonation, smaller particles and gases may be dispersed around the world. Additionally, some explosions injected radioactive material into the stratosphere, more than 10 kilometers above ground level, meaning it may float there for years before being subsequently deposited uniformly around the earth. Global fallout is the result, which exposes everything to an elevated level of man-made background radiation. While "downwinders" refers to those who live and work closest to the explosion site and are thus most acutely affected, there is a global effect of increased health risks due to ionizing radiation in the atmosphere.

=== Health effects ===
The earliest concerns raised about the health effects of exposure to nuclear fallout had to do with fears of genetic alterations that may occur among the offspring of those most exposed. However, the observed inheritable effects of radiation exposure by groups with histories of acute risk are considered minimal compared with the significant increase in thyroid cancer, leukemia and certain solid tumors that have developed within a decade or more after exposure. As studies of biological samples (including bone, thyroid glands and other tissues) have been undertaken, it has become increasingly clear that specific radionuclides in fallout are implicated in fallout-related cancers and other late effects.

Ionizing radiation contained in fallout from nuclear testing is especially damaging to dividing cells. For this reason, fetuses and infants are especially vulnerable to injury. Such cellular damage may later manifest as leukemia and other cancers in children. In 1958, the United Nations Scientific Committee on the Effects of Atomic Radiation reported on fetal and infant deaths caused by radiation.

In 1980, American popular weekly magazine People reported that from about 220 cast and crew who filmed in a 1956 movie, The Conqueror, on location near St. George, Utah, 91 had come down with cancer, and 50 had died of cancer. Of these, 46 had died of cancer by 1980. Among the cancer deaths were John Wayne, Pedro Armendáriz and Susan Hayward, the stars of the film. However, the lifetime odds of developing cancer for men in the U.S. population are 43 percent and the odds of dying of cancer are 23 percent (38 percent and 19 percent, respectively, for women). This places the cancer mortality rate for the 220 primary cast and crew quite near the expected average, but it needs to be noted that this statistic does not include the Native American Paiute extras in the film.

=== Current status ===
After adopting the Comprehensive Nuclear Test Ban Treaty in 1996, the U.S. and several other nuclear states pledged to stop nuclear testing. The United States Senate has not yet ratified the treaty, although it stopped testing in 1992. The final US test series was Operation Julin, in September 1992. Three countries have tested nuclear weapons since the CTBT opened for signature in 1996. India and Pakistan both carried out two sets of tests in 1998. North Korea carried out six announced tests, one each in 2006, 2009, 2013, two in 2016 and one in 2017.

In 2011, the US Senate designated January 27 as a National Day of Remembrance for Americans who, during the Cold War, worked and lived downwind from nuclear testing sites.

For many years, Senator Ben Ray Luján and other members of Congress have attempted to get compensation for those affected by the Trinity test. In 2023, after the film Oppenheimer brought renewed attention to the test, the United States Senate approved the New Mexico downwinders' inclusion in the Radiation Exposure Compensation Act amendment. To become law, the bill would also need to be passed by the United States House of Representatives. As of June 7, 2024, Radiation Exposure Compensation Act (RECA) has expired. The United States Department of Justice announced that it would cease to accept claims postmarked after June 10, 2024; However, a radio station in Arizona named KJZZ reported that the health screening services provided under RECA would remain active "for the time being," according to a statement from the United States Department of Health and Human Services.

== Specific test sites ==
=== New Mexico ===
On July 16, 1945, the United States military conducted the world's first test of an atom bomb in Alamogordo, New Mexico. Code-named Trinity, this explosion also created the world's first victims of an atom bomb: residents of New Mexico.

Years before the test, scientists warned of the risks for civilians of atomic testing. In their memorandum of March 1940, Manhattan Project physicists Otto Frisch and Rudolf Peierls warned: "Owing to the spread of radioactive substances with the wind, the bomb could probably not be used without killing large numbers of civilians, and this may make it unsuitable as a weapon for use by this country." At the very least, they suggested that "[I]t would be very important to have an organization which determines the exact extent of the danger area, by means of ionization measurements, so that people can be warned from entering it." Federal officials for the most part ignored these warnings but a last-minute small team to monitor some of the radiation was assembled. "New Mexico residents were neither warned before the 1945 Trinity blast, informed of health hazards afterward, nor evacuated before, during, or after the test."

=== Nevada ===
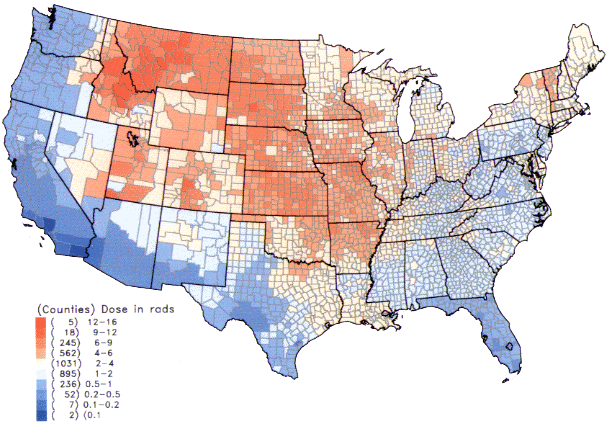
Downwind exposure produced by Nevada Test Site. This map strongly suggests that there are some state-specific differences in reporting.

From 1951 – 1962, the Nevada Test Site (NTS) was a primary site used for both surface and above-ground nuclear testing, with 100 tests at or above ground level, all of which involved releases of significant amounts of radioactive material into the atmosphere. Atmospheric testing was halted in 1958 after a testing moratorium was agreed upon with the Soviet Union. The Soviets broke the agreement in 1961, and both sides resumed testing. Two American test series followed: Operation Nougat, and then Operation Storax. The Partial Nuclear Test Ban Treaty went into effect in 1963, banning all above ground testing. Further tests were underground, which, with the exception of a few test failures, did not release fallout.

In the 1950s, people who lived in the vicinity of the NTS were encouraged to sit outside and watch the mushroom clouds that were created by nuclear bomb explosions. Many were given radiation badges to wear on their clothes, which the Atomic Energy Commission later collected to gather data about radiation levels.

These communities, which were located downwind of the Nevada Test Site, faced not only the direct Nuclear fallout but the indirect health risks that were not sufficiently addressed by federal government messages. Oral histories of the community, which were recorded in the states of Utah, Nevada, and Arizona, reveal the memory of the fallout as having “fallen like snow” on farms, livestock, and water that many communities were not even aware were direct enough to pose direct health threats. Modern records suggest that the impact of the Nevada testing program continues to be linked to contemporary politics, such as the passage of programs for expanded compensation under Radiation Exposure Compensation Act for afflicted communities and calls for federal health study support.

In a report by the National Cancer Institute, released in 1997, it was determined that the nearly ninety atmospheric tests at the Nevada Test Site (NTS) left high levels of radioactive iodine-131 (5.5 exabecquerels, Ebq) across a large area of the continental United States, especially in the years 1952, 1953, 1955, and 1957. The National Cancer Institute report estimates that doses received in these years are estimated to be large enough to produce 10,000 to 75,000 additional cases of thyroid cancer in the U.S. A 1999 review of the 1997 report considered that their estimates of collective doses were in "good agreement" and "should provide confidence that the NCI estimate is not grossly under or over the actual value." A 2006 report, published by the Scientific Research Society, estimates that about 22,000 additional radiation-related cancers and 2,000 additional deaths from radiation-related leukemia are expected to occur in the United States because of external and internal radiation from both NTS and global fallout. A 2010 report evaluating data on thyroid cancer incidence from 1973 to 2004 also supported a relationship between exposure from fallout and increased thyroid cancer incidence.

Just ten tests out of over a thousand total tests at the Nevada Test Site contributed almost 50% of all exposure.

The threat of downwind exposure to radioactivity remaining at the Nevada Test Site from nuclear weapons tests was still an issue as late as 2007. The Pentagon planned to test a 700-ton ammonium nitrate-and-fuel oil "bunker buster" weapon. The planned "Divine Strake" test would have raised a large mushroom cloud of contaminated dust that could have blown toward population centers such as Las Vegas, Boise, Salt Lake City, and St. George, Utah. This project was cancelled in February 2007, in large part due to political pressure inspired by the threat of downwind exposure to radioactivity.

=== Hanford ===
While many downwinders were exposed to weapons testing, millions more have been affected by radioactive fallout due to U.S. sites engaged in the production of nuclear weapons and/or nuclear power. For example, Hanford is a former nuclear weapons production site located in south central Washington state, where the Washington state Department of Health collaborated with the citizen-led Hanford Health Information Network (HHIN) to publicize significant data about the health effects of Hanford's operations. Established in 1943, Hanford released radioactive materials into the air, water and soil, releases which largely resulted from the site's routine operation, though some were also due to accidents and intentional releases.

By February 1986, mounting citizen pressure forced the U.S. Department of Energy to release to the public 19,000 pages of previously unavailable historical documents about Hanford's operations. These reports revealed there had been radioactive materials released into the air and Columbia River. The reactors used large amounts of water from the river for cooling, which caused materials in the river water to become radioactive as they passed through the reactor. The water and the radioactive materials it contained were released into the river after passing through the reactors, thus contaminating both groundwater systems and aquatic animals downstream as far west as the Washington and Oregon coasts.

The Hanford Thyroid Disease Study, an epidemiologic study of the relationship between estimated exposure doses to radioiodine and incidence of thyroid disease amongst Hanford's downwinders, led by the Fred Hutchinson Cancer Center, was inconclusive. A consolidated lawsuit brought by two thousand Hanford downwinders for personal injury against the contractors that ran Hanford has been in the court system for many years. The defense in the litigation is fully funded by taxpayer dollars due to Price Anderson indemnification agreements. The first six bellwether plaintiffs went to trial in 2005, to test the legal issues applying to the remaining plaintiffs in the suit. In October 2015, the Department of Energy resolved the final cases. The DOE paid more than $60 million in legal fees and $7 million in damages.

=== Marshall Islands ===
While the term "downwinders" generally connotes nuclear fallout victims based in the continental U.S. near sites such as Hanford and NTS, the population of the Marshall Islands bore a large brunt of nuclear testing under the United States' Pacific Proving Ground program. Now known officially as the Republic of the Marshall Islands, it was a United Nations Trust Territory administered by the United States from 1944 to 1979, years during which the United States tested 66 nuclear weapons in the Marshall Islands.

One of these many tests, the March 1, 1954, explosion of Castle Bravo, a U.S. thermonuclear device, was responsible for most of the radiation the Marshall Islanders were exposed to. The fallout-related doses of this single test are believed to be the highest recorded in the history of worldwide nuclear testing. Many of the Marshall Islands which were part of the Pacific Proving Grounds remain contaminated by nuclear fallout, and many of those downwinders who were living on the islands at the time of testing have suffered from a highly increased incidence of several types of cancers and birth defects.

In 1972, the displaced people of Enewetak Atoll, a former nuclear test site, sued the United States in an effort to stop further testing. Islanders opposed nuclear testing because it damaged their ancestral lands and caused long-term health problems from nuclear fallout. The People of Enewetak case, under the National Environmental Policy Act (NEPA) of 1969, allowed the islanders to challenge U.S. military activities by requiring that environmental impacts be publicly reviewed. This case led to subsequent legal actions, including the Bikini Atoll case in 1975, which resulted in a resurvey of radiation levels. These efforts highlighted the environmental and health impacts of U.S. nuclear testing and influenced U.S. policy on international environmental law and nuclear cleanup.

In 2023, the United States finalized a new 20 year agreement of aid for the Marshall Islands, totaling in $2.3 billion in funds. Negotiations had been stalled due to disputes over how the United States would remedy the environmental and health related consequences that resulted from the nuclear testing that occurred–of the 2.3 billion dollars negotiated, $700 million was intended to "underwrite a Marshall Islands trust fund. Concerns have risen over the vagueness of the draft bill, referred to as Compacts of Free Association Act, with stakeholders advocating for a clear and defined interpretation boundaries which would be to the benefit of both parties involved. Since the bills introduction and initial controversy, the bill has since been amended to be much more specific in its appropriations to the Marshall Islands as reparations for the injury caused by Nuclear testing of Castle Bravo in 1954; including but not limited to, details of a grant designated for the rehabilitation of agriculture on affected islands, non-reimbursable food programs for the nation's citizens, outlining the President's duty to continue to provide logistic and medical support to the remaining population of affected peoples, and the expansion of the Head Start program to the Marshall Islands. The bill also took on the name of the Consolidated Appropriations Act (H.R.4366) due to its relevance to reparations designated for other nations, not just the Marshall Islands. On March 3, 2024, the Consolidated Appropriations Act was signed into Public Law (no.118-42).

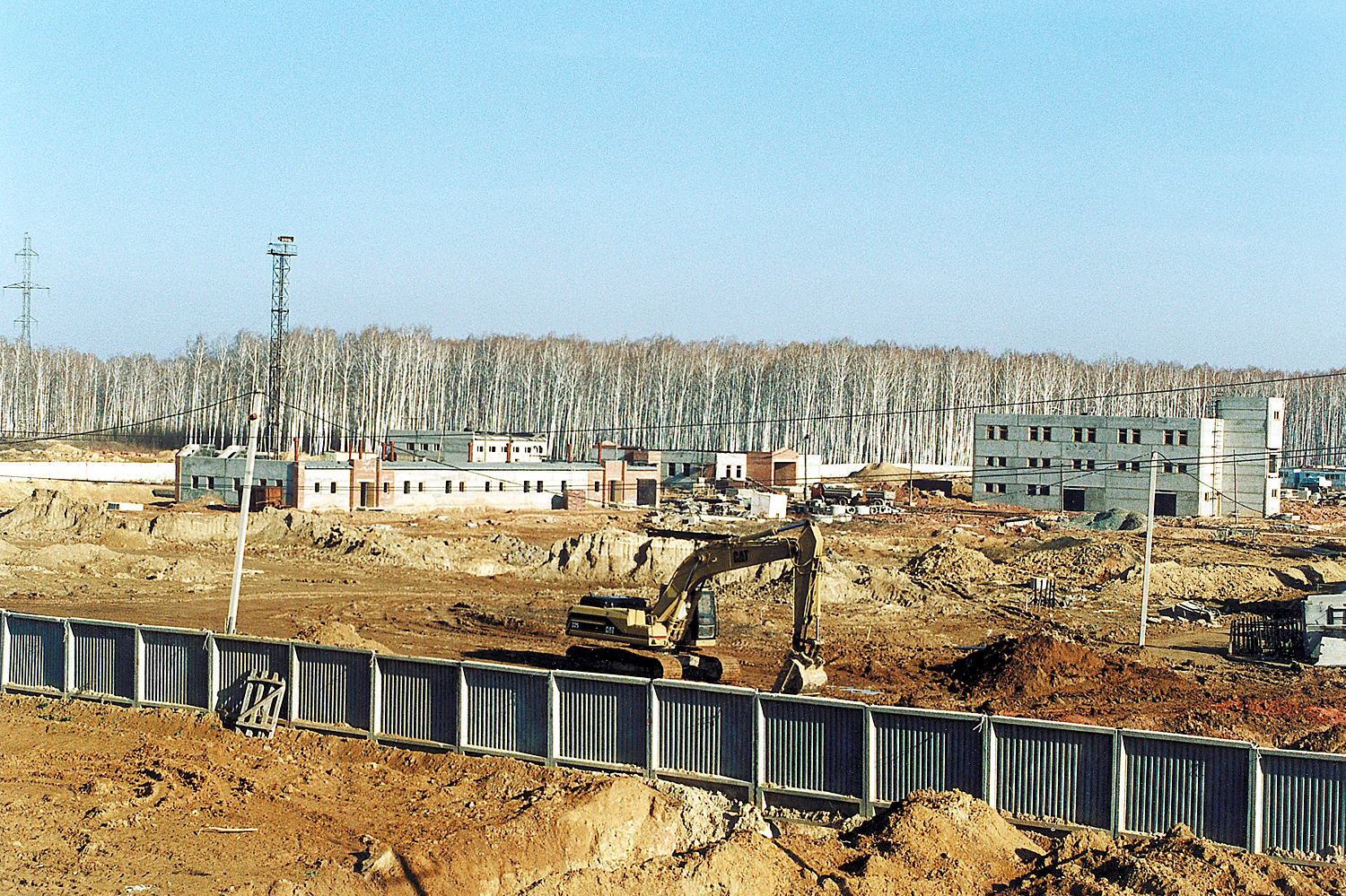
Fissile Material Storage Facility (FMSF) located in Mayak, Russia.

=== Ozersk, Soviet Union ===
Ozersk, a city in present-day Russia, was one of the Soviet Union's secret nuclear cities, hidden from the world as part of its nuclear weapons program. At the heart of this secrecy was the Mayak nuclear plant, where plutonium was produced for the USSR's first atomic bomb. The United States had sent coded messages about this new periodic table element, but the Soviets pushed forward with their own development.

However, Mayak's operations came at a devastating cost. Some of its medium- and low-level waste was dumped into the Techa River, which became exceedingly polluted within six months. High-level waste containers filled rapidly, yet halting plutonium production until more containers were built was never an option. The river carried radioactive water through multiple villages, where residents unknowingly used it for daily activities.

Although the government eventually banned this practice, desperate villagers would sneak past wired fences to access the contaminated stream. As a result, radiation levels in these communities soared to one hundred times the background radiation. People suffered from pain, fatigue, allergies, hypertension, and weight loss. Mothers experienced miscarriages and gave birth to children with severe defects.

== Effects of radiation on female downwinders ==
The primary long-term health hazard associated with exposure to ionizing radiation as a result of nuclear fallout is an increased risk for cancers of the thyroid, other solid tumor cancers, and leukemia. The relationship between radiation exposure and subsequent cancer risk is considered "the best understood, and certainly the most highly quantified, dose-response relationship for any common environmental human carcinogen", according to report by the National Cancer Institute. Overall, men in the United States develop cancer at a rate 22% higher than that of women. However, women develop cancer from radiation at a rate from 37.5% to 52% higher than that of men. In recent years, studies conducted by both the National Research Council and the EPA have confirmed that compared to men, women are at a significantly higher risk of radiation-induced cancers, such and that women's sensitivity to radiation-induced cancers is much higher than was previously estimated. The increased radiosensitivity of certain organs in women, such as the breast, ovaries, and thyroid are likely the cause of this difference.

In the EPA's 1999 Federal Guidance Report #13 (FGR 13), Cancer Risk Coefficients for Environmental Exposure to Radionuclides, the authors conclude that women have a 48 percent higher radionuclide-related cancer mortality risk than men. Further evidence of sex-based disparities in radiation-induced cancers was published in the 2006 report by the National Research Council's Committee to Assess Health Risks from Exposure to Low Levels of Ionizing Radiation (known as the BEIR VII report), which found that women's risk due to radiation exposure exceeded men's by 37.5 percent. When one considers rates of cancer incidence separately from rates of cancer fatality, the sex disparities are even greater. The BEIR VII Committee concluded that, given the same level of radiation exposure, women are 52 percent more likely than men to develop cancer, while the EPA report puts the estimate of difference as high as 58 percent.

The differences in risk are even greater when considering organ-specific cancers, especially given that both reports identify breast, ovarian, lung, colon, and thyroid tissues as the most radiosensitive among women. For example, the FGR 13 has estimated that the ratio of thyroid cancer incidence for women as compared to men is 2.14, while the findings of BEIR VII suggest that women are even more vulnerable to radiation-induced thyroid cancer at a ratio of 4.76.

As increasing concerns are raised regarding the environmental risks related to breast, the BEIR VII report cited evidence that suggests that "radiation may interact synergistically with other risk factors for breast cancer", raising the possibility that endocrine disrupting chemicals like PCBs and dioxins might combine to increase the risks associated with radiation beyond that which would be caused by either separately. A related concern is that radionuclides that may be passed through the breast milk, causing some women who are downwinders to be reluctant to breastfeed their children. While reducing the radioactive intake of their infants is an important preventative measure, it denies women the opportunity to engage a preventative measure for their own health, i.e. breastfeeding has been widely documented as a practice that can reduce women's risk of developing breast cancer. By refraining from breastfeeding, women downwinders' risks of breast cancer incidence become even more elevated.

=== Pregnancy and birth outcomes ===
Evidence about radiation-related pregnancy and birth outcomes comes from studies of nuclear bomb and test site survivors and studies of those exposed to diagnostic and therapeutic radiation. Mounting research indicates that above certain levels of radiation a miscarriage will result. It is also clear that fetal malformations are a greater risk if a woman is exposed to high doses of nuclear-related radiation in early pregnancy, when organs are being formed.

If acute radiation exposure occurs in the first ten days following conception, when few cells have formed, it is likely that the embryo will fail to develop, and spontaneous abortion will occur. Fetal malformations are most likely to occur if a pregnant woman receives a radiation dose >500 mSv between the 10th and 40th day of pregnancy, the period of organogenesis during which the organs are formed. After the 40th day, the effects of radiation exposure are likely to include low birth weight, delayed growth, and possible mental deficits rather than fetal malformations. Radiation doses above 4,000 mSv are likely to kill both the mother and the fetus.

It has been shown that radiation damage including genome instability and carcinogenesis may occur transgenerationally in both males and females. The effects of radiation on fetal formation are also particularly relevant as a women's health issue to the extent that female fetuses' ova are formed while the fetus is still in utero. Adverse effects on a mother carrying a female fetus may therefore be multigenerational and increase both the daughter's and grandchildren's risks for ovarian cancer, infertility, and other reproductive developmental problems.

== Compensation ==
In 1990, the U.S. Congress passed the Radiation Exposure Compensation Act (RECA), providing financial assistance to individuals who suffered from radiation exposure-related diseases, including lung cancer, leukemia, multiple myeloma, lymphomas, thyroid cancer, breast cancer, as well as nonmalignant respiratory conditions such as lung fibrosis and pulmonary fibrosis. This law specifically aimed to compensate former uranium miners who fell ill during the time when the U.S. Government was the sole purchaser of uranium. Since its establishment in 1990, RECA has provided benefits exceeding $2.5 billion to over 39,000 claimants.

Initially, RECA had narrow definitions regarding eligible people and covered diseases, but complaints arose regarding these limitations, leading to efforts to amend the act. In 1999, recognizing the need for change in the compensation process under the Radiation Exposure Compensation Act (RECA), four bills were submitted in the U.S. Congress aimed at amending the act. Advocacy initiatives were directed towards extending coverage to include additional occupations, lower the standard of proof for uranium miners, eliminate distinctions between smokers and nonsmokers, and increase compensation for eligible individuals, which led to approved amendments to RECA in 2000, expanding coverage and modifying eligibility criteria to assist affected groups.

Downwinders eligible for compensation include those living in specified counties of Nevada, Utah, and Arizona for at least two years between January 1951 and October 1958, or during July 1962-periods when the United States conducted above ground nuclear tests without warning, and who are able to show correlations between certain diseases and their personal exposure to nuclear radiation. Miners' compensation covers workers employed in uranium mines in five states-Colorado, New Mexico, Arizona, Wyoming, and Utah-between January 1947 and December 1971. Uranium miners are eligible for $100,000, and onsite participants are eligible for $75,000.

=== Navajo-related obstacles ===
There are particular obstacles to receiving needed health care and compensation faced by many widows and widowers of Navajo uranium miners, who were affected by disproportionately high incidences of fatal lung cancer caused by radon exposure. In fact, the health effects of radon were first widely acknowledged when Mormon and Native American miners who hardly smoke (the main reason for lung cancer) had high incidences of lung cancer. Modern mining practices greatly reduce the danger from radon - also present in many coal mines – by proper ventilation. One problem for Navajo widows and widowers seeking the federal benefits for which they are qualified is the requirement that they document their marriages, although many were married in the 1930s and 1940s in undocumented tribal ceremonies. Language and cultural barriers pose further obstacles to Navajo downwinders; since many elderly Navajos do not speak English, their children bear the responsibility to do the research and procure from a tribal law judge a validation certificate of their tribal marriage. Similarly, it is difficult to access the outdated medical and occupational documentation that the government required even though the government's and uranium companies' own records for Navajo miners are sparse and difficult to access.

== See also ==
- Tularosa Basin Downwinders Consortium
- Baby Tooth Survey
- Chernobyl disaster
- Daigo Fukuryū Maru
- Nevada-Semipalatinsk
- New Zealand's nuclear-free zone
- Project 4.1
- Windscale fire
- Atomic veteran
- The Plutonium Files
