= Radiation Exposure Compensation Act =

US law

- Long title: An Act to provide jurisdiction and procedures for claims for compassionate payments for injuries due to exposure to radiation from nuclear testing.
- Acronyms (colloquial): RECA
- Nicknames: Radiation Exposure Compensation Act of 1990
- Enacted by: the 101st United States Congress
- Effective: October 15, 1990

Citations
- Public law: 101-426
- Statutes at Large: 104 Stat. 920

Codification
- Titles amended: 42 U.S.C.: Public Health and Social Welfare
- U.S.C. sections amended: 42 U.S.C. ch. 23 § 2210 et seq.

Legislative history
- Introduced in the House as H.R. 2372 by Wayne Owens (D–UT) on May 16, 1989; Committee consideration by House Judiciary; Passed the House on June 5, 1990 (agreed voice vote); Passed the Senate on August 1, 1990 (passed voice vote) with amendment; House agreed to Senate amendment on September 27, 1990 (agreed voice vote); Signed into law by President George H.W. Bush on October 15, 1990

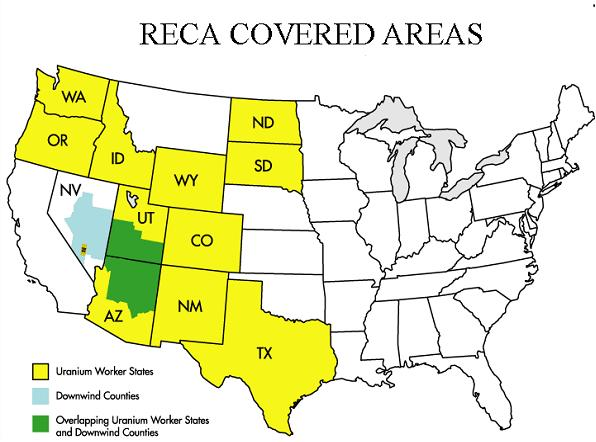
Areas covered by the Radiation Exposure Compensation Program

The United States Radiation Exposure Compensation Act (RECA) is a federal statute implemented in 1990, providing for the monetary compensation of people, including atomic veterans, who contracted cancer and a number of other specified diseases as a direct result of their exposure to atmospheric nuclear testing undertaken by the United States during the Cold War as residents, or their exposure to radon gas and other radioactive isotopes while undertaking uranium mining, milling or the transportation of ore.

The Act has been providing the following remunerations, unchanged since 1990 despite inflation:

- $50,000 to individuals residing or working "downwind" of the Nevada Test Site
- $75,000 for workers participating in atmospheric nuclear weapons tests
- $100,000 for uranium miners, millers, and ore transporters

In all cases there are additional requirements which must be satisfied (proof of exposure, establishment of duration of employment, establishment of certain medical conditions, etc.).

In 2022, the law was to expire, and President Joe Biden extended the filing deadline for another two years.

== Origins, 1979 ==
Attempts to enact the legislation can be traced back to the late 1970s. In its fifth draft, a Bill entitled Radiation Exposure Compensation Act of 1979 was sponsored by Senator Ted Kennedy of Massachusetts. The Bill intended to make compensation available to persons exposed to fallout from nuclear weapons testing and for living uranium miners (or their survivors) who had worked in Utah, Colorado, New Mexico and Arizona between 1 January 1947 and 31 December 1961.

The Bill proposed to pay compensation to persons who lived within prescribed areas for at least a year, to persons who "died from, has or has had, leukaemia, thyroid cancer, bone cancer or any other cancer identified by an advisory board on the health effects of radiation and uranium exposure".

Fallout areas listed by the bill included counties in Utah and Nevada:

Utah counties included Millard, Sevier, Beaver, Iron, Washington, Kane, Garfiend, Piute, Wayne, San Juan, Grand, Carbon, Emery, Duchesne, Uintah, San Pete and Juab. Nevada's "affected areas" were listed as the counties of White Pine, Nye, Lander, Lincoln and Eureka. The Bill as drafted, would have also compensated ranchers whose sheep died following nuclear weapons tests "Harry" (13 May 1959) and "Nancy" (24 May 1953).

Ten years later, Wayne Owens (D–UT introduced H.R. 2372, which added uranium miners who worked in Wyoming to the list, and extended the eligible date rate for employed miners to between 1947 and 1971.

== Implementation, 1990 ==
Twelve years transpired before the bill was finally enacted. The Radiation Exposure Compensation Act was passed by Congress on October 5, 1990, and signed into law by President George H. W. Bush on October 15, 1990. In the successful bill it was written that Congress "apologizes on behalf of the nation" to individuals who were "involuntarily subjected to increased risk of injury and disease to serve the national security interests of the United States."

In some cases, it proved to be extremely difficult for people to receive their compensation, including cases filed by widows of uranium miners. Because many uranium miners were Native Americans, they did not have standard marriage licenses required to establish a legal connection to the deceased. In 1999, revisions were published in the Federal Register to assist in making award claims. Many mine workers and their families found the paperwork difficult and qualifications narrow and were declined compensation.

== Exclusion ==
People living in the surrounding area near Trinity (the first nuclear test) site in New Mexico were, unlike the Nevada test site, unaware of the project and not included in the 1990 Radiation Exposure Compensation Act support for affected downwinders.

== Compensation ==
The Act provides the following remunerations, as of 2023, unchanged since 1990 despite inflation:

- $50,000 to individuals residing or working "downwind" of the Nevada Test Site
- $75,000 for workers participating in atmospheric nuclear weapons tests
- $100,000 for uranium miners, millers, and ore transporters

=== Eligibility ===
In order to be eligible for compensation, an affected uranium industry worker must have developed lung cancer, fibrosis of the lung, pulmonary fibrosis, cor pulmonale related to fibrosis of the lung, silicosis or pneumoconiosis following their employment. In the case of uranium mill workers and ore transporters, renal cancer and chronic renal disease are also compensable conditions.

== Amendments and expiration ==
In 2000, amendments were passed which added two new claimant categories like uranium mill and ore workers, both eligible to receive as much money as uranium miners, added additional geographic regions to the "downwinders" provisions, changed some of the recognized illnesses, and lowered the threshold radiation exposure for uranium miners.

In 2002, additional amendments were passed as part of another bill, primarily fixing a number of draftsmanship errors in the previous amendments which had accidentally removed certain geographic areas from the original act and clarified a number of points.

In 2019, H.R. 3783 was introduced to extend RECA to 2045, expand downwinder eligibility to include Idaho, Montana, New Mexico, Guam, and Colorado, to expand uranium worker eligibility to those who worked after 1971, until 1990, also covering people involved in the cleanup of Enewetak Atoll of the Marshall Islands from 1977 to 1981, increase the compensation to $150,000 for all claimants, and to allow people exposed to atmospheric testing to receive the same medical benefits as Department of Energy workers, eligible under the Energy Employees Occupational Illness Compensation Program.

In 2022, the law was to expire, but President Joe Biden extended the filing deadline for another two years until July 2024.

For many years Senator Ben Ray Luján and other members of Congress have attempted to get compensation for those affected by the Trinity test. After the film Oppenheimer brought renewed attention to the test, the United States Senate approved the New Mexico downwinders' inclusion in the RECA amendment. To become law, the bill would also need to be passed by the United States House of Representatives.

On July 7, 2024, the law expired, with any applications made after July 10 not processed. This left many victims without compensation. The law was reauthorized on July 3, 2025, by Congress, as well as changing the eligibility criteria so that more people would be eligible, like victims that lived in areas "downwind" of nuclear bomb tests, such as Utah are now eligible.

== Status of claims ==
It was initially expected that hundreds of compensation claims would be paid under the Act, a figure which later proved to be a gross underestimate.

As of 15 July 2012, 25,804 claims under the act had been approved (with 9,869 denied), expending a total of $1,707,998,044.

As of 19 November 2013, 43,068 claims were filed, 11,619 claims were denied, 748 claims were pending and 30,701 were awarded. These numbers did not include the Marshall Islands.

As of 2 March 2015, over $2 billion in total compensation had been paid to 32,000 successful claimants under the Act.

As of 16 March 2016, successful claims had been awarded to 19,555 downwinders, 3,963 onsite participants, 6,214 uranium miners, 1,673 uranium millers and 328 ore transporters.

As of 20 April 2018, 34,372 claims in total had been approved with total compensation paid at $2,243,205,380.

As of 12 January 2023, 40,274 claims have been approved with total compensation paid at $2,598,374,306. Successful claims include: 25,663 downwinders, 5,388 onsite participants, 6,896 uranium miners, 1,921 uranium millers and 406 ore transporters.

As of 15 July 2024, 41,900 claims have been approved with total compensation paid at $2,693,750,307. Successful claims include: 26,863 downwinders, 5,665 onsite participants, 6,996 uranium miners, 1,956 uranium millers and 420 ore transporters.

== See also ==
- Compensation scheme for radiation-linked diseases (United Kingdom)
- Tularosa Basin Downwinders Consortium
- Uranium mining and the Navajo people
- Nuclear weapons and the United States
- Pacific Proving Grounds
- Radium and radon in the environment
- Uranium mining in the United States
- Uranium mining debate
- Anti-nuclear movement in the United States
- Nuclear labor issues
