= Defence Police Federation =

- Founded: 1971
- Headquarters: Ground Floor, MoD Main Building, Horseguards Avenue, Whitehall SW1A 2HB
- Location: United Kingdom
- Members: 2000
- Key people: Eamon Keating (National Chairman); Peter Clout (General Secretary); Jim Gillen (National Vice-Chairman)
- Website: www.dpf.org.uk

The Defence Police Federation (DPF) is the representative body of Ministry of Defence Police (MDP) officers, up to and including the rank of Chief Superintendent. There are around 2,000 members as of 2014. Membership is restricted by law to serving officers. MDP officers have their own federation because they are also part of the Civil Service and are accountable to the Secretary of State for Defence, and not the Home Secretary. Moreover, MDP officers have different terms and conditions of service to civilian police officers. Officers' pay is directly linked to national settlements made by the Home Office and the Police Federation of England and Wales. The DPF also administer the Defence Police Retired Officers Association. With an 'all armed' membership, the DPF maintains close ties with the Police Firearms Officers Association (PFOA); as of 1 October 2014 all DPF members, have automatic membership of the PFOA.

== History ==
Prior to 1971 each of the three armed services had its own constabulary, with its own Chief Constable. Each of those constabularies had its own staff association. To boost their bargaining power these three staff associations formed a Federal Council in 1953, but this arrangement was found to be unsatisfactory, and in 1971 the associations agreed to form a Defence Police Federation.

The new federation believed that the Ministry of Defence's three police forces should be amalgamated into a single, unified force. It argued that amalgamation was the only way to realise the potential of the three forces and enhance their officers' professionalism. Even before the formation of the Defence Police Federation, the individual Defence constabularies' staff associations' had fought against the notion that their members should receive an abated rate of pay. In 1971 the MoD agreed to amalgamation, and the Ministry of Defence Police was formed.

The next landmark in the history of the MDP was also, to an extent, the result of the federation's efforts. Ever since the establishment of the force in 1971, the federation had campaigned for an Act of Parliament to replace the maze of regulations, statutory provisions, and instructions on which the MDP's legal authority was based. The federation believed that such an act would enable MDP officers to discharge their duties more easily and enhance their credibility as police officers. On 5 May 1987 the Ministry of Defence Police Act came into force. It solidified the force's constabulary powers across Great Britain and Northern Ireland, and gave full legal status to the federation, putting it on par with the representative bodies of other UK civilian police forces.

== Organisation ==
The DPF employs a hierarchical structure, starting with individual station branches, these form the foundation of the Federation. These branches are organised geographically into two national areas: Southern and Northern. Each has its own Area Secretary.

Routine management of the federation is overseen by the National Executive Committee (NEC), who meet quarterly. The NEC is composed of the three national officers—the Chairman, Vice Chairman and General Secretary—and six voting members elected at the National Conference from branch representatives. The NEC and its sub-committees are responsible for negotiating, and consulting, with the Chief Constable MDP, senior officers of the MDP and directly with the Ministry of Defence. The federation also has access to the MoD Police Committee, with either the National Chairman or General Secretary attending as an observer.

The supreme authority of the federation is the annual DPF National Conference. This consists of all branch representatives coming together to consider policy and receive reports on the business conducted throughout the year. The conference may also debate resolutions about improving conditions of service and related matters, or revise the rules and constitution of the federation.

== Function ==
The Federation's constitution lists the organisation's main aims. These are:

- To protect and improve the conditions of employment of its members.
- To raise the status of the MoD's police force and to enhance its efficiency.
- To offer a welfare service to Federation members.
- To provide members with legal advice and assistance on matters arising from their employment.
- To make available to members, a wide range of benefits and other services including insurance.
- To maintain liaisons with representative bodies of other police services, when this is judged to be in the best interests of members.

Like other British police officers, MDP officers do not have the right to strike, nor do they have recourse to an Employment Tribunal if they believe they were wrongly dismissed.

== MDP Cuts ==
Police numbers were cut substantially by the government elected in the 2010 general election. The DPF campaigned against cuts to the Ministry of Defence Police that substantially reduced the number of MDP officers and the force's budget. The National Chairman stated to The Daily Telegraph that:

"Inevitably the loss of the experience of MDP officers would be to the public detriment and would be to the detriment of the security of the MoD, there's no doubt about that. Public security would be potentially reduced."

== See also ==
- Police Federation of England and Wales
