= Nuclear gypsy =

Temporary worker in nuclear industry

A nuclear gypsy is a temporary worker who performs the least desirable work in the nuclear power industry.

Japanese writer Kunio Horie gave this name to "contract workers who have traditionally performed the dirtiest, most dangerous jobs for Japan's power utilities."

While the term became more widely used after the 2011 Fukushima disaster, the Japanese nuclear industry has used such contracted maintenance and sanitary workers since the 1970s. The term is used with contempt for transient workers, based on the sometimes-derogatory name for the Romani people. Also called a jumper, nuclear gypsies move from one temporary assignment to another nuclear power plant.

These are "construction workers, truck drivers, and unemployed men ... [s]ome ... recruited from day-labor centers where jobless people gather hoping to find work." About a hundred subcontractors employ about 3,000 workers, compared to about 400 workers directly employed by TEPCO.

These temporary workers often have several motives for working under dangerous conditions, which may be high in radioactivity: most often cited are "high wages and a sense of duty", but they also do not comprehend the grave risks involved. For example, one worker interviewed by The Guardian worked temporarily to assist his mother financially, which paid more than truck driving, but he did not realise until after the project completed that he'd been exposed to twice the radiation dose allowed by law. Like all those who depend on casual work for survival, some workers may have alcohol abuse or have other personal issues that make them unsuitable for permanent work. After a 1992 recession, some workers jumped for scarce work at the Fukushima nuclear power plant. In 2011, they were paid the equivalent of $127 per day—much more than many other unskilled labor jobs, but a fraction of what the TEPCO staff earned.

Other occupational stressors include heat, stifling uniforms and poor-quality food served in the company mess. There have been insufficient "rest areas ... water coolers, and ... coolant vests to prevent heatstroke," historically, but those problems are now being addressed.

== See also ==
- Construction worker
- Radioactive contamination
- Workplace hazards
- Nuclear labor issues
