= Nuclear labor issues =

Radiation workers health and labor issues

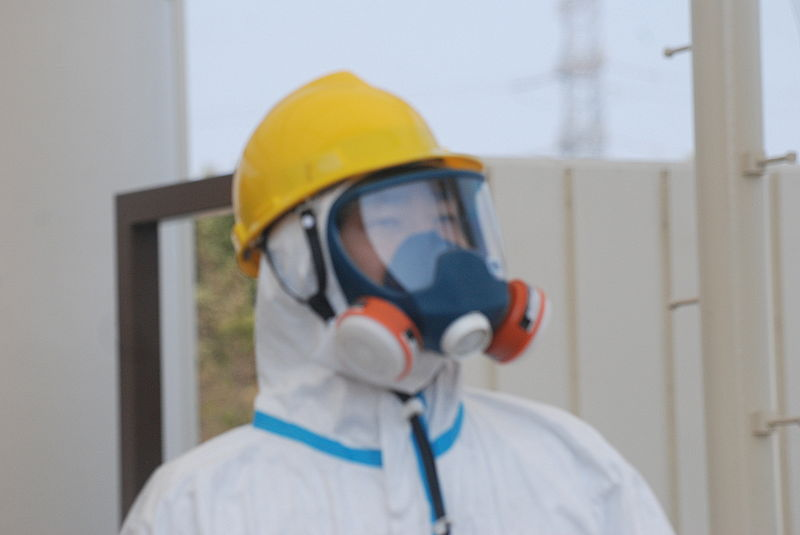
Fukushima Nuclear Power Plant, April 13, 2011

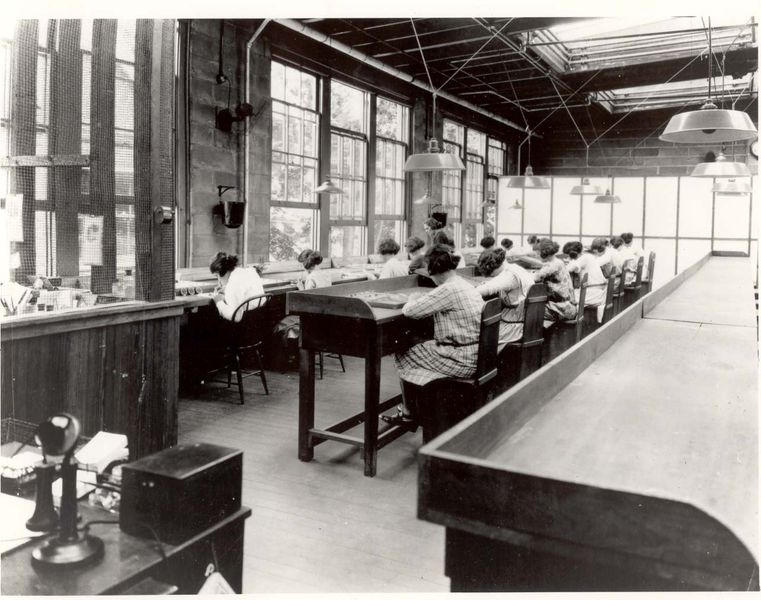
Radium Girls - Argonne

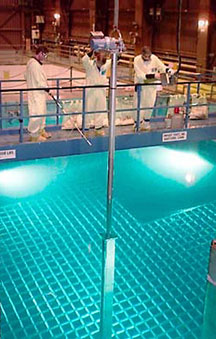
Fuel pool

Nuclear labor issues exist within the international nuclear power industry and the nuclear weapons production sector worldwide, impacting the lives and health of laborers, itinerant workers and their families.

A subculture of frequently undocumented workers do the dirty, difficult, and potentially dangerous work shunned by regular employees. They are called in the vernacular Nuclear Nomads, Bio-Robots, Luminizers, Glow Boys, Radium Girls, the Fukushima 50, Liquidators, Atomic Gypsies, Gamma Sponges, Nuclear Gypsies, Genpatsu Gypsies, Nuclear Samurai and Jumpers. When they exceed their allowable radiation exposure limit at a specific facility, they often migrate to a different nuclear facility. The industry implicitly accepts this conduct as it cannot operate without these practices. The World Nuclear Association states that the transient workforce of "nuclear gypsies" – casual workers employed by subcontractors – has been "part of the nuclear scene for at least four decades."

Existing labor laws protecting workers' health rights are not always properly enforced. Records are required to be kept, but frequently they are not. Some personnel were not properly trained resulting in their own exposure to toxic amounts of radiation. At several facilities there are ongoing failures to perform the required radiological screenings or to implement corrective actions.

Many questions regarding working conditions for these nuclear workers go unanswered, and with the exception of a few whistleblowers, the vast majority of laborers – unseen, underpaid, overworked and exploited – have few incentives to share their stories. The median annual wage for hazardous radioactive materials removal workers, according to the U.S. Bureau of Labor Statistics was $37,590 in 2014 – $18 per hour. A 15-country collaborative cohort study of cancer risks due to exposure to low-dose ionizing radiation, involving 407,391 nuclear industry workers showed a significant increase in cancer mortality. The study evaluated 31 types of cancers, primary and secondary.

== Uranium mining and milling ==
=== Canada ===
In 1942 thirty indigenous Dené men were recruited to mine uranium, locally known as "the money rock" for three dollars per day at the Port Radium mine. By 1998, 14 of these workers had died of lung, colon and kidney cancers, according to the North West Territory's Cancer Registry. The Dené were not told of the hazards of mining uranium, and breathed radioactive dust, slept on the ore, and ate fish from the tailings ponds. According to declassified U.S. documents, Ottawa was the world's largest supplier of uranium at that time, and the United States was the biggest buyer. In subsequent decades, thousands of First Nations miners were not warned of the risks.

=== Namibia ===
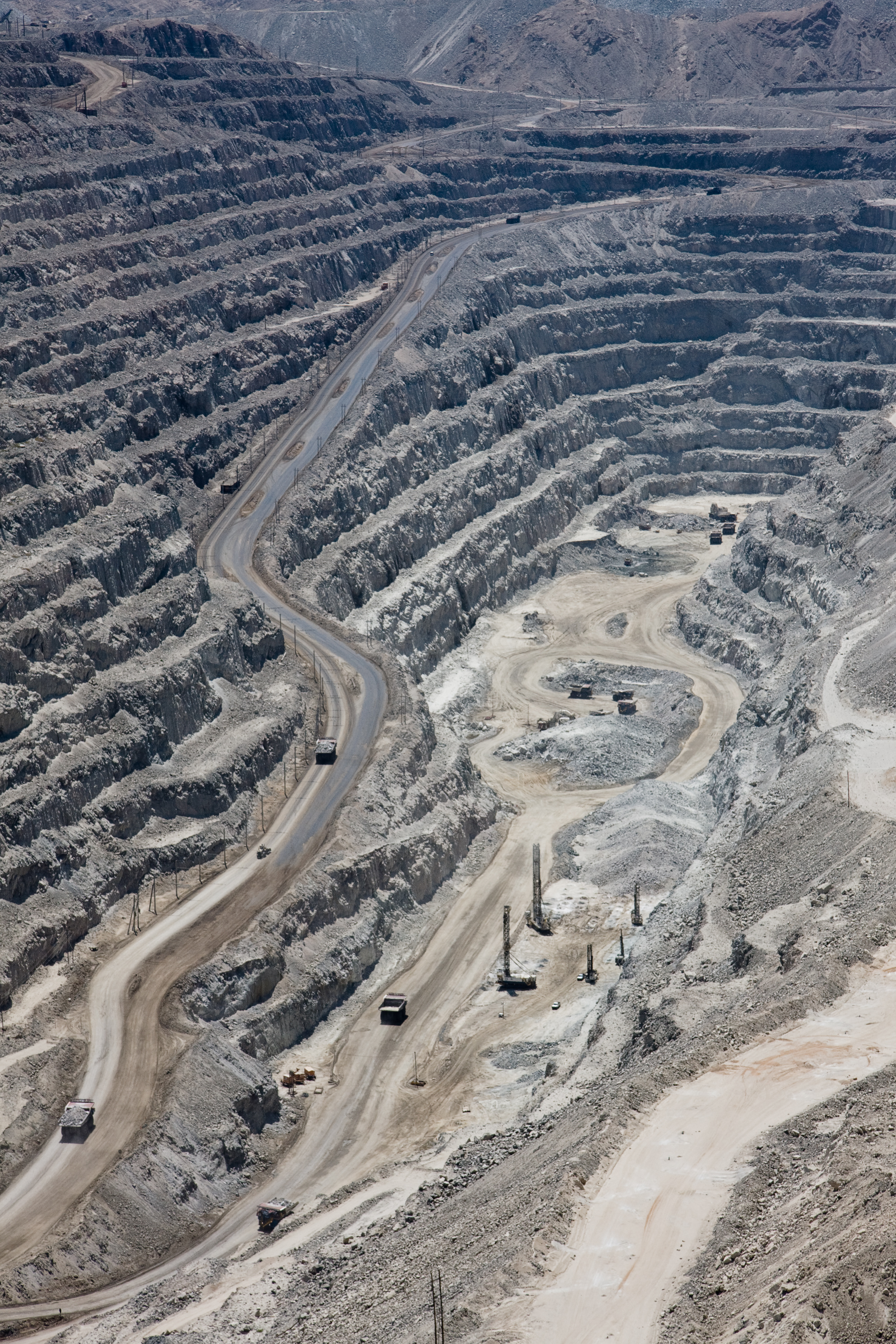
Rössig open-pit uranium mine near Arandis, Namibia

Namibia's Rössing Uranium Mine is the longest-operating open-pit uranium mine, and one of the largest in the world. The company is owned and operated by Rio Tinto, one of the world's largest mining groups, and Rössing Uranium Limited. The uranium mill tailings dam has been leaking for a number of years, and on January 17, 2014, a catastrophic structural failure of a leach tank caused a major spill. The France-based laboratory, Commission de Recherche et d'Information Indépendantes sur la Radioactivite (CRIIAD) reported elevated levels of radioactive materials in the area surrounding the mine.

There have been numerous reports published on labor and human rights conditions at the mine. Workers were not informed of the dangers of working with radioactive materials and the health effects thereof. The Director of Labor Resource and Research Institute (LaRRI), Hilma Shindondola-Mote, and mine employees asserted that Rössing did not provide them with an explanation of health problems from exposure to uranium.

=== Malawi ===
At the open cut Kayelekera uranium mine near Karonga, Malawi (Africa), a mine employee, Khwima Phiri, was killed on July 20, 2013. He was struck in the chest and killed while inflating a wheel. There have been allegations of radiation-induced diseases among the mine workers and nearby residents. The Malawi government stated to be unable to verify these due to a lack of monitoring equipment. On June 19, 2011, a truck at the mine caught fire, killing the driver. On September 23, 2010, workers were ordered to work despite the fact that the mine could not provide them with dust masks to protect them against radioactive materials.

=== New Zealand and Australia ===
The American and British demand for large quantities of uranium to use in nuclear weapons initiated New Zealand's uranium survey during WWII. In 1944 in Wellington, geologists and physicists assembled two exploration teams to survey the South Island, particularly the granite deposits and black beach sand areas. In 1945, Fiordland, Milford Sound, Nancy Sound and other locations were surveyed, resulting in the December 7, 1945 NZ Atomic Energy Act granting full ownership of any discovered radioactive elements - however not to the indigenous peoples whose ancestral lands contained these materials. In 1955, another rich uranium deposit was discovered by prospectors Frederick Cassin and Charles Jacobsen. In the following years prospectors traveled through rainforests and other terrain with Geiger counters, jackhammers and drills. These workers were exposed to unsafe levels of radiation through exposure to and inhalation of dust. In Australia, uranium mining was no less unrestrained than in New Zealand. At the Nabarlek, Rum Jungle, Hunter's Hill, Rockhole and Moline mines, gamma radiation exceeded safe levels by 50% causing chronic health problems for miners and workers.

=== United States ===
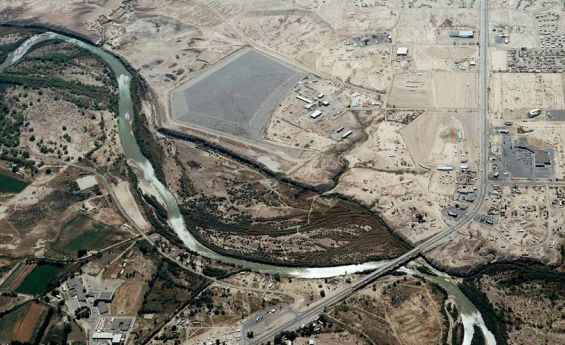
Shiprock, New Mexico uranium mill aerial photo

Between 1949 and 1989, over 4,000 uranium mines in the Four Corners region produced more than 225,000,000 tons of uranium ore. This activity impacted on a large number of Native American nations, including the Laguna, Navajo, Zuni, Southern Ute, Ute Mountain, Hopi, Acoma and other Pueblo cultures. Many of these peoples worked in the mines, mills and processing plants in New Mexico, Arizona, Utah and Colorado. These workers were not only poorly paid, they were seldom informed of dangers nor were they given appropriate protective gear. The government, mine owners, scientific, and health communities were all well aware of the hazards of working with radioactive materials at this time. Due to the Cold War's demand for increasingly destructive and powerful nuclear weapons, these laborers were both exposed to and brought home large amounts of radiation in the form of dust on their clothing and skin. Epidemiological studies of the families of these workers have shown increased incidents of radiation-induced cancers, miscarriages, cleft palates and other birth defects. The extent of these genetic effects on indigenous populations and the extent of DNA damage remain to be resolved. Uranium mining on the Navajo reservation continues to be a disputed issue as former Navajo mine workers and their families continue to suffer from health problems.

== Asian nuclear industry ==
=== India ===
- In March 1993 at India's Narora reactor an accident occurred in which two blades broke off a steam turbine leading to a hydrogen leak, hydrogen fire and oil fire. At this time India's Atomic Energy Commission and Department of Atomic Energy (DAE) were not required to "reveal the health record of workers" nor did the DAE "monitor the health of temporary workers" nor "reveal the quantity of radioactive substances released into the environment by accidents."
- In May, 2014, six contract workers were injured at the Kudankulam Nuclear Power Plant in Tamil Nadu, India, and hospitalized for burns received during repair work. In March 2014, a contract worker was killed and two injured during the construction of a nuclear submarine at the ship building town of Visakhapatnam.

=== South Korea ===
- Twenty two workers were exposed to radiation at the Wolsung nuclear power plant, near Seoul, South Korea on October 5, 1999, when 45 liters of heavy water leaked.
- On December 26, 2014, three workers at the new Shin Kori nuclear power plant died of a suspected nitrogen gas leak. The accident occurred after a series of threats by hackers claiming they can remotely control nuclear power plants.

=== Japan ===
==== Fukushima ====
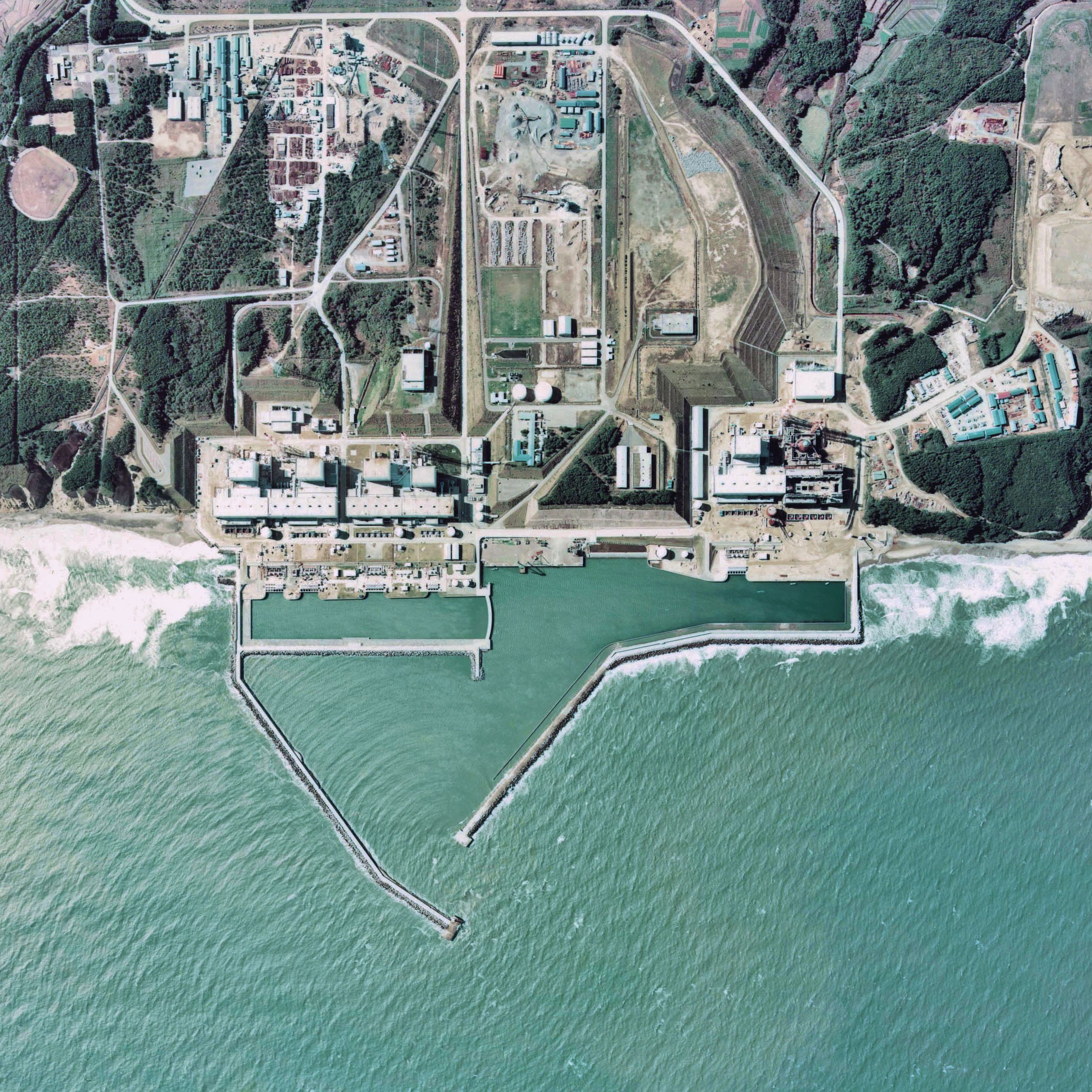
Fukushima I NPP 1975

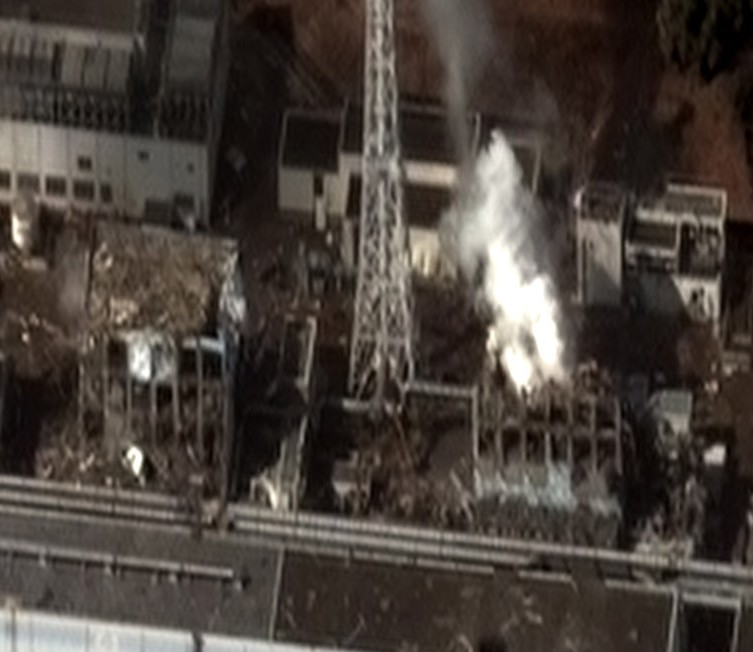
Fukushima I reactor units 3 and 4 by Digital Globe

Following a large earthquake and tsunami on March 11, 2011, three nuclear reactors melted down at the TEPCO Fukushima Daiichi power station in Japan. Despite TEPCO's ongoing efforts to stabilize, decommission, decontaminate and contain the radioactive materials, many workers have been exposed to significant doses of radiation. Both skilled and unskilled laborers work on the extensive clean-up crew, many of those involved in the most dangerous work are on short contracts. These "nuclear gypsies" or "jumpers" are often recruited from day labor sites across Japan.

Contract labor in the nuclear industry is not new. Years prior to the Fukushima accident, the Los Angeles Times reported in 1999 that nearly 90% of Japanese nuclear power plant workers were subcontracted to perform the most hazardous jobs. Included in the report is the incident at the Tokaimura JCO Co. nuclear plant, 80 miles north of Tokyo, where 150 workers were exposed to radiation, including one fatality, based on the Japan Nuclear Safety Commission report. In 1999, the Los Angeles Times reported that nearly 90% of Japanese nuclear power plant workers were subcontracted to perform the most hazardous jobs. In 2010, the year before the Fukushima accident, 88% of Japan's nuclear workforce of 83,000 workers were contracted, not full-time workers. The Tokyo-based Citizens' Nuclear Information Center reported that temporary workers absorbed 16 times higher levels of radiation than regular TEPCO employees. Other sources cite higher dose levels and alleged worker abuse. The first responders to the accident, the "Fukushima 50" have refused to be photographed, as TEPCO and the Japanese government has not released their names and faces, they remain unknowable and forgotten. Keeping the cleanup crew fully staffed, 24 hours per day, on 12-hour shifts, rotating every three days is a physical and logistical challenge to an emergency that will sustain for decades during which an ongoing stream of workers is required. In a lecture given May 3, 2011 to the All Freeter's Union in Tokyo by the photographer Kenji Higuchi, "The Truth of the Fukushima 50", he cites TEPCO's lack of responsible oversight. He is of the opinion that the Fukushima 50 are victims of unsafe working conditions, not heroes, as they are depicted in the media. The few workers who have come forward, such as Shingo Kanno, describe themselves as "nuclear samurai", helping to save Japan from the spread of radiation while doing menial labor at the Fukushima nuclear plant. Upon arriving onsite, some workers were told by their managers that the level of radiation was so high their annual exposure limit could be reached within an hour. The extent of the disaster has initiated searches for clean-up workers from other countries, including the U.S. Many clean-up workers at Fukushima have found that they are not eligible for free cancer screenings from TEPCO or the Japanese government. As of November 2012, only 3.7% have been granted screenings, although many have been exposed to high levels of radiation, and all work in highly contaminated zones.

Japan's second largest construction company, Obayashi Corporation, was found to, perhaps illegally, assign homeless men from the Sendai train station to work as decontamination laborers at the crippled reactors. Several arrests were made of members of Japanese criminal syndicates, Yamaguchi-gumi, Inagawa-kai, and Sumiyoshi-sai, for arranging black-market labor recruitment operations for Obayashi. The day-labor gray markets in Tokyo and Osaka were also found to recruit homeless men, paying them $6 per hour after deductions for food and lodging. Other workers were paid as little as $10 per month after deductions. Some workers report they were simply left unpaid. Among the temporary clean-up workers who have come forward, Tetsuya Hayashi was told he would monitor worker exposures at Fukushima for two weeks during the summer of 2012. Upon arriving at the disaster site, he was deployed to an area with extremely high radiation levels, rather than the monitoring station. Although Hayashi was provided with protective gear, he thinks the agency engaged in "bait and switch" approaches to recruitment. Later he accepted a second contract job from another agency at TEPCO's Fukushima Daiichi plant, working on spent fuel rod tanks. He reported that the new contracting agency only paid him 2/3rds of his wages. In over 80 interviews of workers conducted by Reuter's journalists, a frequent complaint was the lack of proper training. They also cited alliances between the contractors, subcontractors and Yakuza organized crime group. While TEPCO does not make worker wages public, the interviewees stated their average earnings were between $6 and $12 per hour. Another worker to speak out, Ryo Goshima, claims his employment broker skimmed half his pay from his wages. The oversight is poorly managed by TEPCO and the Japanese government; as of mid-2013 several hundred small companies had been granted decontamination work. According to the Carnegie Endowment for International Peace global think tank report, complete remediation of the site is likely to take three or four decades.

Between January 2015 and March 2015 there was a ten-fold increase of workers at the Fukushima Daiichi plant who received exposures in excess of 5 mSv, according to a TEPCO report. TEPCO's records show that 57 workers were exposed to 5 to 20 mSv in January, 2015; 327 workers exposed to that rate spectrum in February 2015: and in March 2015, 585 workers were exposed to the 5-20 mSv range. On January 19, 2015, a worker died at the Fukushima Daiichi NPS after falling into an empty water tank. The following day, January 20, at the Fukushima Daini plant, a worker's head was trapped between a 7000 kg piece of moving machinery and the scaffolding, killing him. At another TEPCO plant, Kashiwazaki Kariwa NPS, a worker was seriously injured on January 19, 2015. In response, work at the three nuclear power plants was suspended by TEPCO to analyze the accidents, and develop a safety plan. On October 20, 2015, the New York Times reported that Japan will begin to pay Fukushima accident disaster laborers recompense for cancers developed from participating in the clean up of the triple meltdowns and fuel pool clean-ups.

==== Tokaimura nuclear facility ====
The Dōnen accident (動燃事故 (Dōnen jiko)) occurred on March 11, 1997. A small explosion occurred at a nuclear reprocessing plant, exposing 37 workers to radiation. On September 30, 1999, a more serious accident occurred resulting in two deaths at the JCO (formerly Japan Nuclear Fuel Conversion Company) facility in Tokai, Ibaraki Prefecture. While preparing enriched uranium fuel for use in the Jōyō experimental breeder reactor, a criticality accident lasting 20 hours occurred during which the nuclear fission chain reaction emitted intense gamma and neutron radiation. At least 667 workers, nearby residents and emergency response team members were exposed to excess radiation. Two technicians, Hisashi Ouchi and Masato Shinohara, died from the accident. Radiation levels at the plant were 15,000 time higher than normal.

== European nuclear industry ==
=== France ===
France is an international leader in the nuclear power industry throughout the world. A study by the National Institute for Health and Medical Research (INSERM) in France concluded that the largest and least visible population of chronic exposure to ionizing radiation are the nuclear industry's "thousands and even hundreds of thousands of workers who perform daily maintenance and upkeep operations and tasks in nuclear plants, nuclear testing facilities, research centers, reprocessing plants, and nuclear waste management centers." France's 50-year long nuclear industry has not historically kept records of worker's internal and external exposure to radiation. The effects of risk to workers and the impact of subcontracting the most dangerous tasks within the industry is intensified by nuclear secrecy. On May 22, 1986, a nuclear fuel reprocessing plant at La Hague in Normandy, sustained a mechanical malfunction. Five workers were exposed to unsafe levels of radiation and hospitalized. On April 12, 1987, the Tricastin Nuclear Power Plant fast breeder reactor coolant leaked contaminating seven workers. In July 2008, approximately 100 workers were exposed to a radiation leak.

=== Soviet Union ===
==== Chernobyl (1986) ====
Chernobyl radiation 1996

The Chernobyl nuclear reactor meltdown occurred on April 26, 1986, in Ukraine, during a test of the Unit 4 reactor systems. The explosion and fire caused by human error released massive amounts of radioactive material into the environment, irradiating a large area of Europe, in particular Belarus, Ukraine and the Russian Federation. The cleanup of the radioactive meltdown debris involved 600,000 laborers (NRC statistics), known as "jumpers" or "liquidators". These cleanup workers received hundreds of times of the average annual radiation dose allowed in the United States. Statistics on the numbers of deaths, illnesses and genetically produced mutagenic diseases in the following generations remains in debate depending on the source of information. The statistics vary from 4,000 deaths to 93,000 deaths. According to the 2011 report of the German Affiliate of International Physicians for the Prevention of Nuclear War (IPPNW), "Health Effects of Chernobyl: 25 years after the reactor catastrophe" based on Yablokov's 2010 report, there were 830,000 clean-up workers; 350,000 evacuees from the 30 km highly contaminated zone; 8,300,000 people who were affected within the heavily irradiated area in Belarus, Ukraine and Russia; and six hundred million (600,000,000) European people who had exposures to radiation from the accident (Fairlie, 2007). It is estimated that 700,000 "liquidators" - clean up workers - received 100 millisieverts of radiation, and others received higher doses.

==== Mayak Production Association ====
The purpose of the Mayak Production Association facility was to produce plutonium for nuclear weapons. In its earlier years of operation, exposures to radiation were significantly higher than at other similar facilities. Mayak was one of the largest nuclear facilities in the Russian Federation, and was formerly known as Chelyabinsk-40 and later as Chelyabinsk-65. It was the site of the Kyshtym disaster (1957) when a storage tank explosion released 50-100 tons of high-level radioactive waste, contaminating a 290 square mile area in the eastern Ural mountains, causing radiation sickness and death. The event was rated 6 "serious accident" on the 7-level INES nuclear incident/accident scale. The incident received little attention, as it was kept secret for 30 years. Many laborers who worked at the plant during the 1950s and 1960s died from exposures to radiation. The accident was first reported in 1976 by Zhores Medvedev in the journal New Scientist, it was in 1992 that the Russian government officially acknowledged the accident.

=== United Kingdom ===
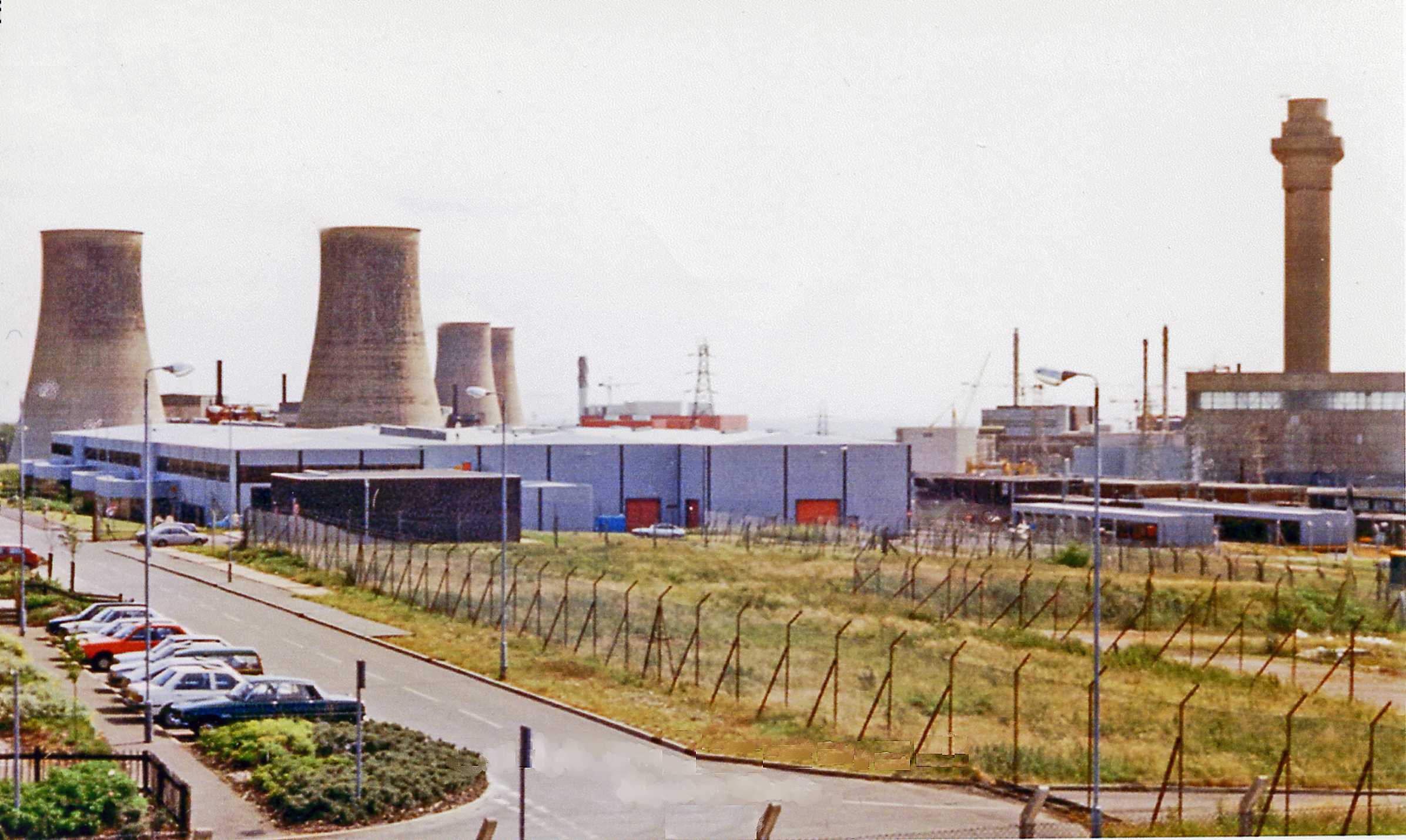
Sellafield geograph-3503250-by-Ben-Brooksbank

The Sellafield nuclear reprocessing plant, located on the coast of the Irish Sea, is built on the former site of the Windscale nuclear reactor and Calder Hall. The British government began developing the site in 1947 as the Windscale Piles plutonium production plant, its graphite reactor core was cooled by air, rather than water as the US reactors at the Hanford site. By 1952 the facility was separating plutonium from spent uranium fuel. In 1957 the Windscale fire destroyed the core of Pile #1, exposing workers to 150 times the "safe dose limit" of radioactivity and releasing approximately 750 terabecquerels of radioactive material into the environment. The incident is rated a "5" on the International Nuclear Event Scale (INES) of nuclear accidents and incidents. A 1990 study of childhood leukemia and other cancers in the offspring of Sellafield, Dounreay and Seascale nuclear workers show elevated levels of occurrence. There have been 21 significant accidents and incidents of radioactive material releases between 1950 and 2000. Tissue samples and organs were removed from 65 deceased former Sellafield workers, as announced by Trade Secretary, Alistair Darling in 2007, and confirmed by Peter Lutchwyche of the British Nuclear Group. On January 28, 1998, a damaged plutonium-contaminated filter in building B209, causing thirteen workers to be evacuated, necessitating two workers to undergo tests for internal as well as external contamination. Photographic documentation of equipment contaminated with plutonium, poor signage and substandard barriers were cited. Glow Boys, a 1999 film by Mark Ariel Waller, interprets this event and others in relation to energy, economy and power and labor. In January 2014, Sellafield issued an order for thousands of workers to not report to work due to elevated levels of radioactivity onsite.

== American nuclear industry ==
=== Nuclear weapons production workers ===
In a report based on reviews of raw data on nuclear worker health drafted by the Department of Energy (DOE) and the White House National Economic Council (NEC), the U.S. government found that workers at 14 nuclear weapons plants were exposed to unsafe levels of radiation and other toxins, resulting in a wider range of cancers. The Applied-Industrial Chemical and Energy Workers Union states that workers had higher rates of leukemia, lung cancer, bladder cancer and other diseases. The DOE and NEC panel found that nearly 600,000 nuclear weapons workers developed other cancers as well: Hodgkin's lymphoma, prostate cancer, kidney cancer, and salivary gland cancer. The Oak Ridge K-25 facility, Tennessee, Savannah River Site, the Hanford Site, Rocky Flats Plant, Fernald Feed Materials Production Center, Lawrence Livermore National Laboratory and Los Alamos National Laboratory are among the 14 sites studied. Statistics from the Department of Labor, Office of Workers Compensation Program (OWCP) Division of Energy Employees Occupational Illness Compensation are found posted weekly. The U.S. Federal Register Executive Order 13179, of December 11, 2000 states that thousands of Americans who built the U.S. nuclear defense:

paid a high price for their service, developing disabling or fatal illnesses as a result of exposure to beryllium, ionizing radiation, and other hazards unique to nuclear weapons production and testing. Too often, these workers were neither adequately protected from, nor informed of, the occupational hazards to which they were exposed.

The document goes on to state that existing worker's compensation programs have failed due to long latency periods of radiation-caused disease as well as inadequate record keeping of data.

==== Military workers and contractors ====
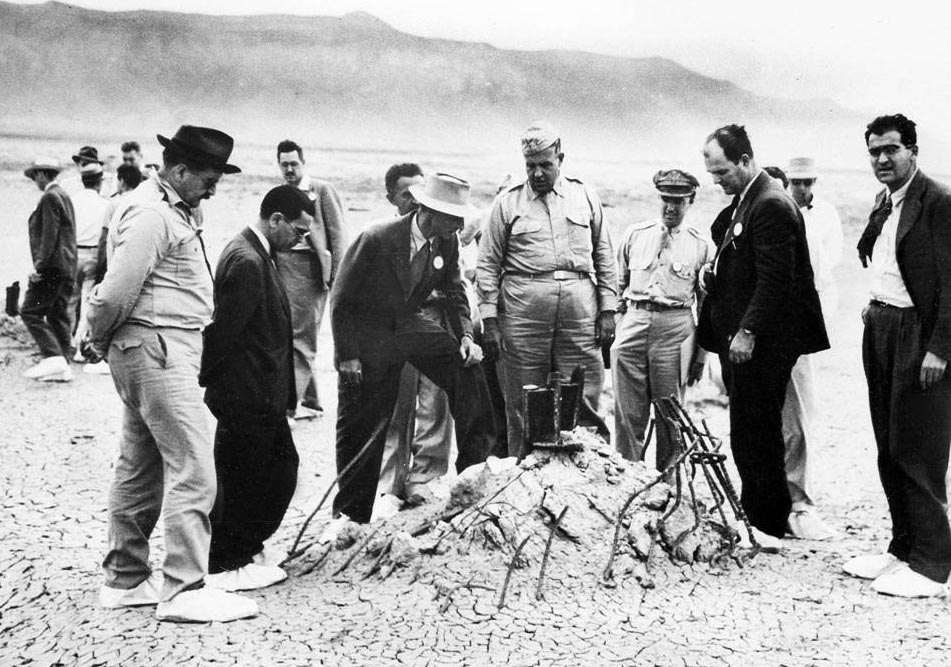
Trinity Test - Oppenheimer and Groves at Ground Zero 001

The exposure of military workers and contractors to radioactive materials that exceed safe doses is well documented. After the bombings of Hiroshima and Nagasaki, military workers were sent to these areas to examine and clean up the rubble. Many of these U.S. veterans developed bone marrow and blood abnormalities, multiple myeloma, leukemia, Hodgkin's disease, myelofibrosis and cancers. During the nuclear weapons testing in the Marshall Islands approximately 300,000 GIs were exposed to radiation, the U.S. Department of Defense estimates 210,000 servicemen, however the National Association of Atomic Veterans cite between 250,000 and 400,000. The 2008-9 National Cancer Institute/U.S. Department of Health reports that exposure to radiation from nuclear weapons testing is a worldwide issue of significant concern.

Hundreds of thousands of military personnel and civilians in the United States received significant radiation doses as a result of their participation in nuclear weapons testing and supporting occupations and industries, including nuclear fuel and weapons production, and uranium mining, milling, and ore transport. Hundreds of thousands more were irradiated at levels sufficient to cause cancer and other diseases. These populations include the families of military and civilian workers, and people – known as "downwinders" – living or working in communities surrounding or downstream from testing and related activities, and in relatively distant areas to which nuclear fallout or other radioactive material spread. Federal responses to the plight of affected individuals have been unsatisfactory.

=== Nuclear weapons production facilities ===
==== Fernald Feed Plant – Ohio, U.S. ====
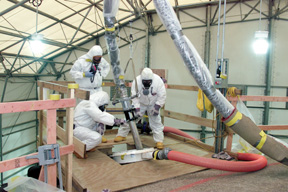
Fluor Fernald Workers

For decades, radioactive isotopes of plutonium, uranium, radium, thorium and technetium were released from the Fernald Feed Materials Production Center in Ohio, entering into the air, land and water, including deep ground water of the Great Miami aquifer. Workers and area residents showed higher rates of systemic lupus erythematosus, certain cancers, and low blood cell counts. A study by the National Institute for Occupational Safety and Health (NIOSH) determined that salaried workers had lower mortality rates than per-hour workers, despite both groups having increased malignancies of blood, bone, spleen, lymph and thyroid cancers. While the plant was under construction in 1952, labor disputes broke out between carpenters and other laborers, in what was reported as "rioting" and "mob action". In 1954, a chemical explosion caused the death of two workers. In 1959, a strike ensued at the factory regarding the quota system. Machinists, steel workers and sheet metal workers went on strike. In 1974, employees voiced their concerns over health hazards. In 1984, National Lead of Ohio, the manager of the site, admitted that radioactive dust was released, and groundwater contaminated. In 1990, Fernald employees and/or their survivors filed a class action suit over health hazards.

==== Hanford Nuclear Reservation – Washington, US ====
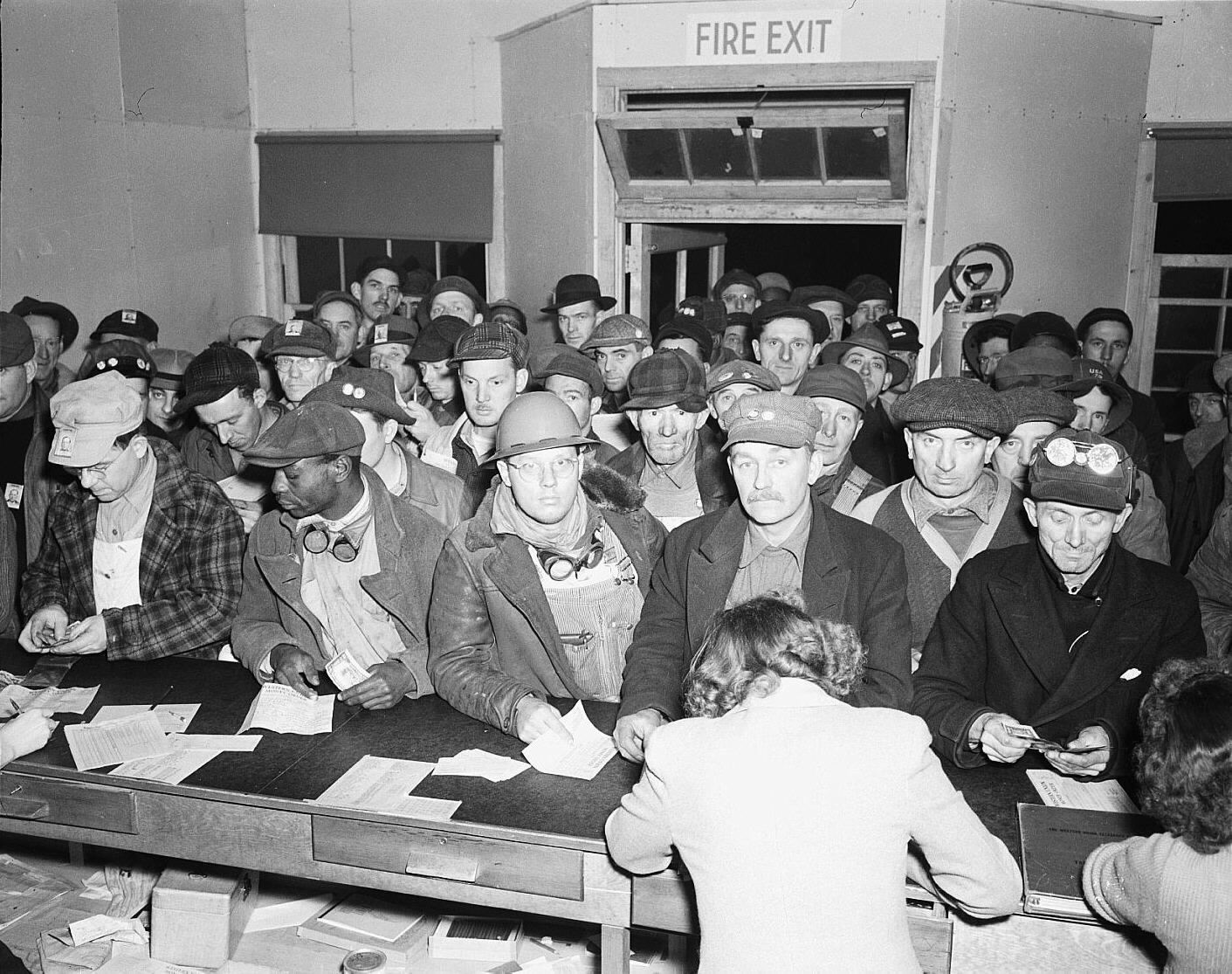
Hanford workers

The Hanford Nuclear Reservation (HNR), also known as the Hanford Site, located in Washington State in the western United States adjacent to the Columbia River, is a nuclear materials production complex that is in the process of being decommissioned. HNR was founded in 1943 as part of the Manhattan Project for large-scale production of plutonium for use in nuclear weapons, including the first nuclear bomb tested at the Trinity site in New Mexico, and the Fat Man nuclear bomb used at Nagasaki, Japan, during WWII. Hanford is considered the most contaminated nuclear waste site in America. Much of the clean-up has focused on water and land contamination from leaking tanks, as well as airborne radioactive dusts.

In 1976, a chemical reaction caused a glove box to explode at the Plutonium Finishing Plant, contaminating Harold McCluskey (aged 64). The site of the accident, (242-Z )was closed-off due to high levels of radioactivity, decontamination did not begin until 2014, thirty eight years after the accident. The "McCluskey Room" was used to separate americium from plutonium during the Cold War. McCluskey received the highest dosage of americium of any human being, 500 times the occupational standard, and was so radioactive, his body had to be removed by remote control and placed in a steel and concrete isolation tank where glass and metal were removed from his skin and tissues. He survived the accident. After five months of treatment, involving scrubbings and shots of zinc DTPA, he was permitted to return home, as his radiation count had fallen from 500 above standard to 200 times above safe occupational level.

==== Idaho National Laboratory – Idaho, US ====
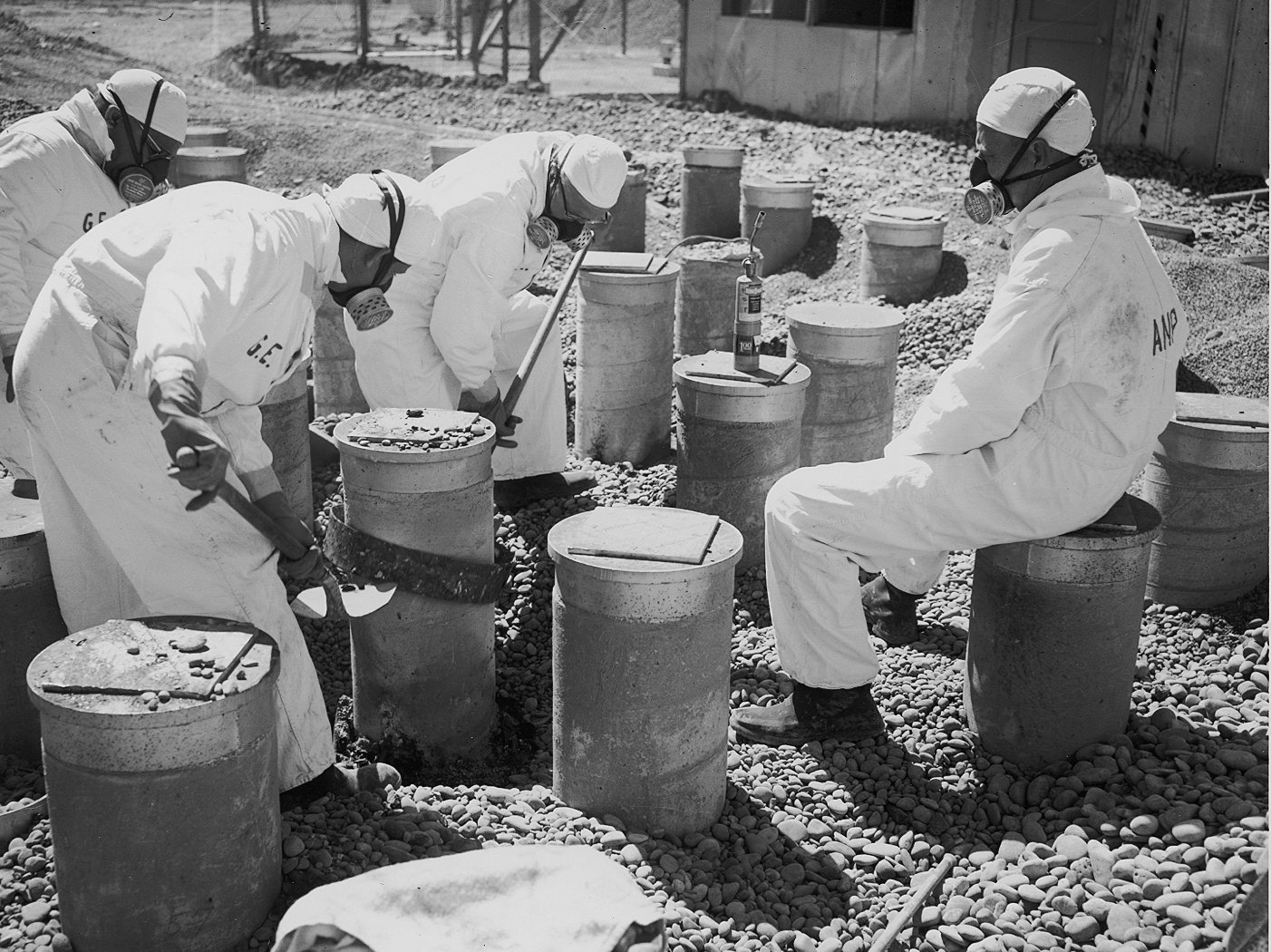
SL-1 - Dismantling of the foundation piers

Idaho National Laboratory near Arco, Idaho was founded in 1949 as a nuclear reactor testing laboratory. Some consider it to be the site of the first fatal accident in the nuclear military/industrial sector when the SL-1 boiling water reactor melted down, killing two reactor operators, a third operator died shortly thereafter. When a control rod in the reactor was removed manually causing a power surge and ensuing criticality, a steam explosion occurred in the reactor vessel. The event caused the reactor lid to be blown nine feet into the air. The three operators were heavily irradiated and their remains were buried in lead coffins.

There have been other accidents involving radioactive uranium and plutonium in later decades, including an incident in 2011 when seventeen workers were exposed to low-level radiation from plutonium.

==== Los Alamos National Laboratories – New Mexico, US ====
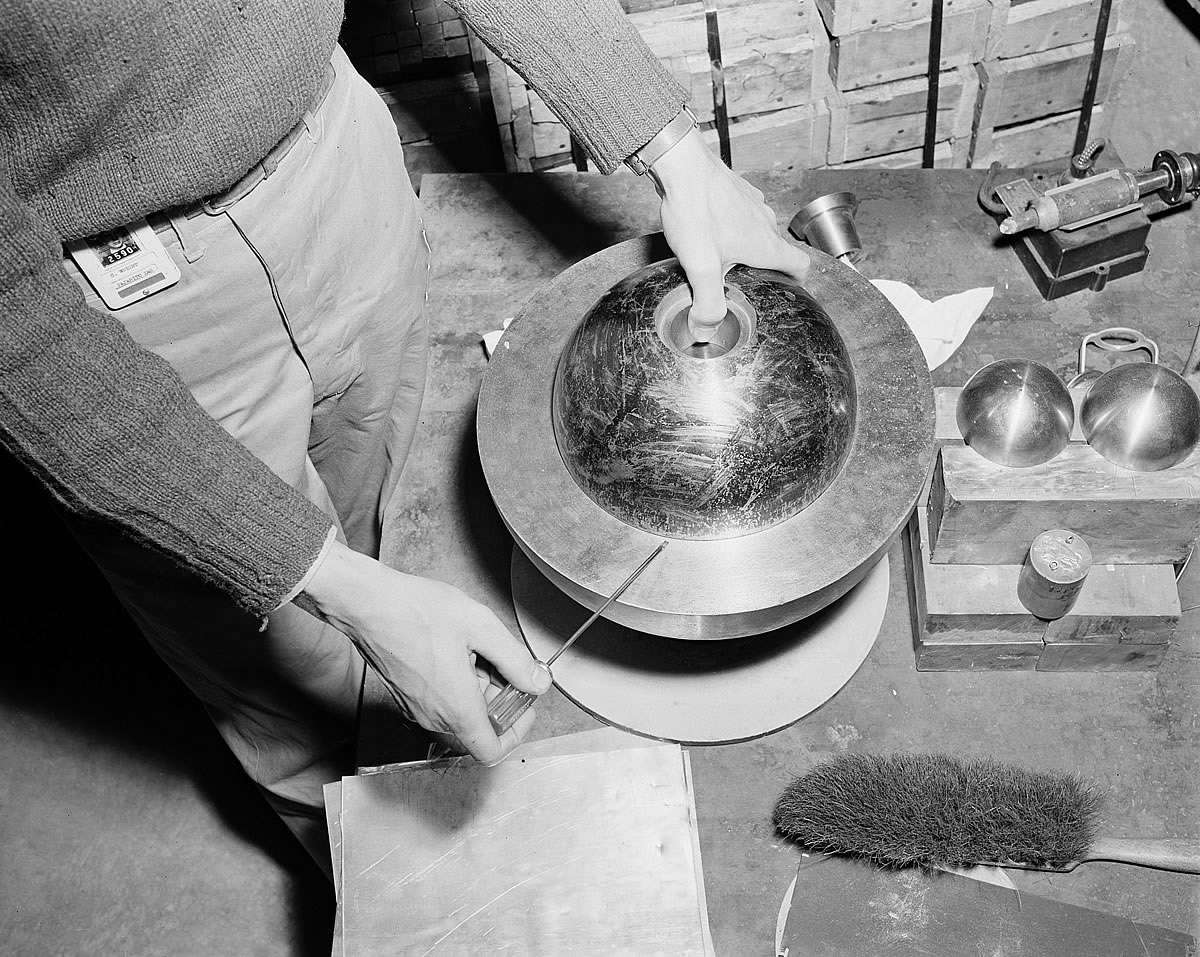
Re-creation of Slotin's experiment with the "demon core"

The occupational health studies of the Los Alamos National Laboratory and surrounding communities show elevated levels of certain disease rates among workers. A plutonium core for a nuclear weapon, nicknamed the "Demon Core" was involved in two accidents at LANL in 1945 and 1946, leading to the acute radiation poisoning and later the deaths of scientists Harry Daghlian and Louis Slotin. The first criticality incident occurred on August 21, 1945, when physicist Harry Daghlian accidentally dropped the core, causing a burst of neutron radiation that contaminated him and a security guard, Private Robert J. Hemmerly. The second incident caused the death of physicist, Louis Slotin, and contaminated seven other employees.

==== Oak Ridge – Tennessee, US ====
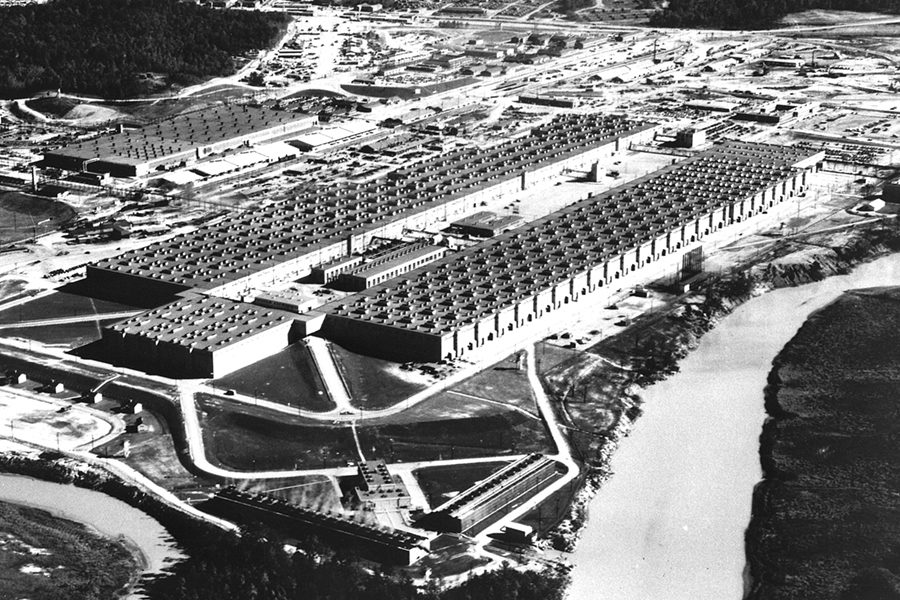
K-25 aerial view cropped

The secret atomic city of Oak Ridge, Tennessee was part of the Manhattan Complex. Workers there were exposed to radioactive materials at plants X-10, K-25 and Y-12, and qualify for compensation from the 2011 Energy Employee Occupational Illness Compensation Act (RECA) for illnesses resulting from their work at the Oak Ridge Reservation. Workers there were exposed to highly enriched uranium and plutonium due to inadequate storage and security at the Oak Ridge plant.

==== Pantex Plant – Texas, US ====
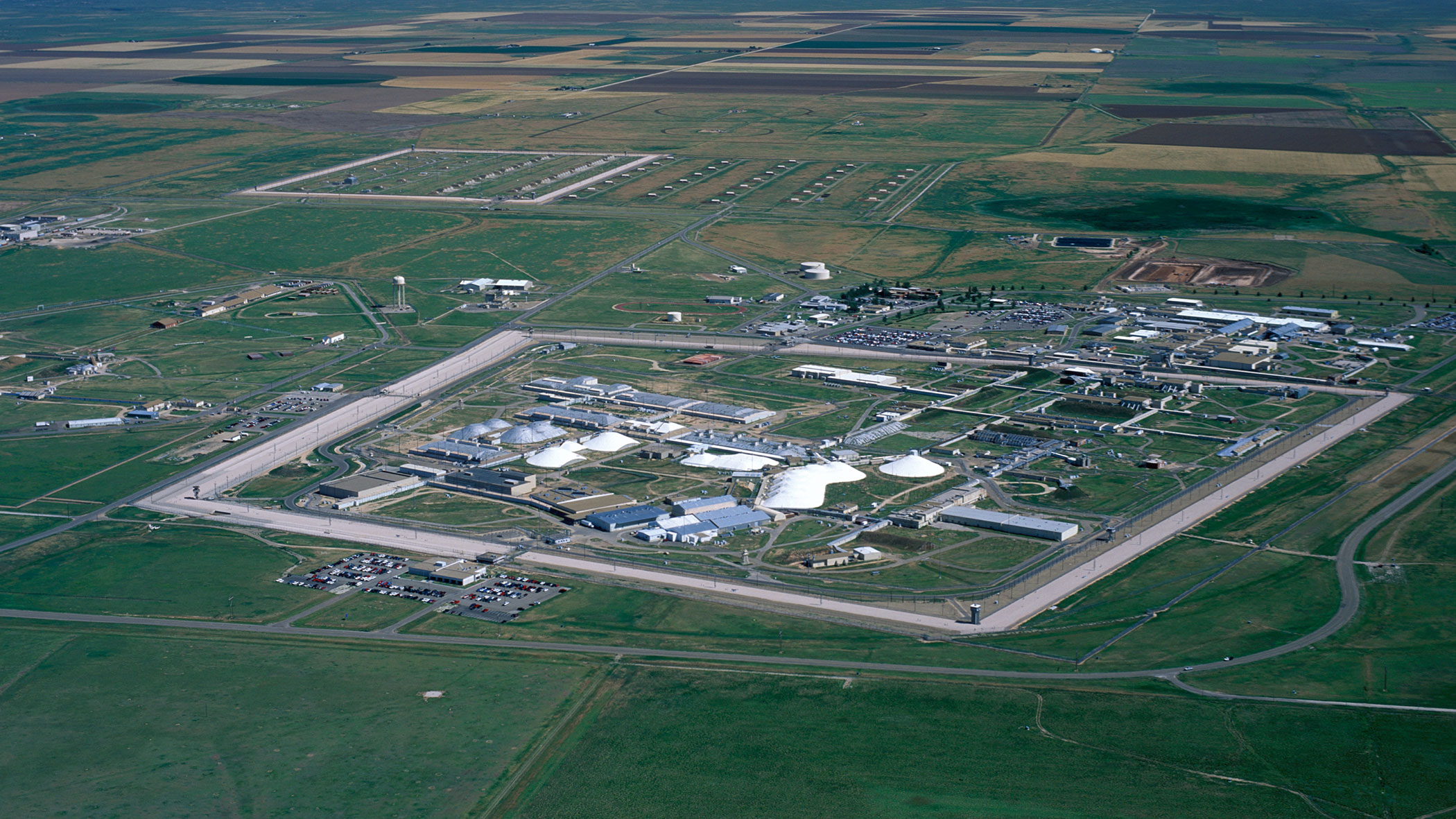
Pantex Aerial

The Pantex Plant is a nuclear weapons assembly and disassembly plant located in the Texas Panhandle region. It also provides technology for manufacturing, evaluating and testing nuclear explosives. It is listed by the United States Environmental Protection Agency as a Superfund Site. A 2014 report in the Global Security Newswire, reports that the contractor overseeing the Pantex nuclear weapons facility was cited for numerous safety hazard incidents. The U.S. Department of Energy cited B&W Pantex (Bechtel and Babcock & Wilcox) for six safety incidents. The DOE Office of Health, Safety and Security's chief of enforcement and oversight, John Boulden, states these "events are significant in that they involved improper management, handling or labeling of highly hazardous materials, including explosives, which have the potential to cause serious injury or death." B&W Pantex did not receive any fines for this breach of worker's safety. As of 2015, the U.S. government plans to spend $1 trillion over the next thirty years to modernize its nuclear stockpile. Plans to cut spending include cutting health and retirement benefits for workers in the nuclear weapons industry. The Government Accountability office confirms the National Nuclear Safety Administration officer's statement: "reducing labor costs represents a large share of cost savings to be achieved." Worker's benefits via the Consolidated Nuclear Security contract at Pantex, as well as at Oak Ridge, Tennessee's Y-12 National Security Complex, will be cut as per Department of Energy regulation Order 350.1.

==== Rocketdyne – California, US ====
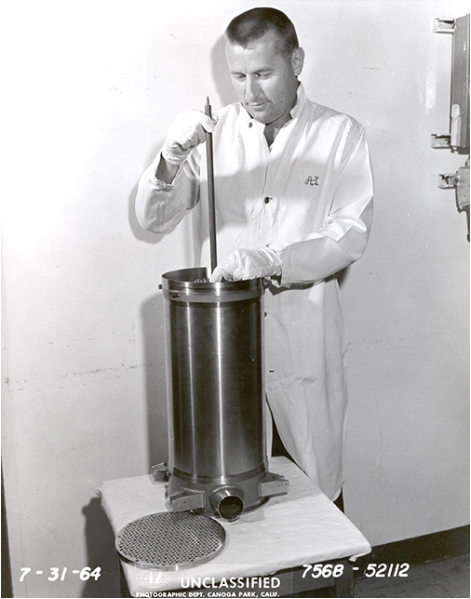
SNAP 8DR core assembly

Between 1957 and 1964, Rocketdyne located at the Santa Susana Field Laboratory, 30 miles north of Los Angeles, California operated ten experimental nuclear reactors. Numerous accidents occurred including a core meltdown. Experimental reactors of that era were not required to have the same type of containment structures that shield modern nuclear reactors. During the Cold War time in which the accidents that occurred at Rocketdyne, these events were not publicly reported by the Department of Energy.

- 1957: a fire raged out of control in the Hot Lab leading to "massive contamination."
- 1959: the AE6 reactor released fission gasses, later that year the SRE facility suffered a partial nuclear reactor core meltdown, releasing 459 times the radiation as the Three Mile Island accident.
- 1964: 80% of the SNAP8-ER reactor's fuel was damaged. 1969: the SNAP8-DR reactor lost one third of its fuel.
- 1971: a radioactive fire broke out from the combustion of sodium reactor coolant that had been contaminated with fission products.

In 1979, Rocketdyne released to the public that these events occurred. In 1999 the site was remediated, although thousands of pounds of contaminated sodium coolant cannot be accounted for. Local residents, including former workers filed a class-action suit in 2005, and were awarded $30 million. Many of the workers and local residents were already deceased at the time of the settlement.

==== Rocky Flats Plant – Colorado, US ====
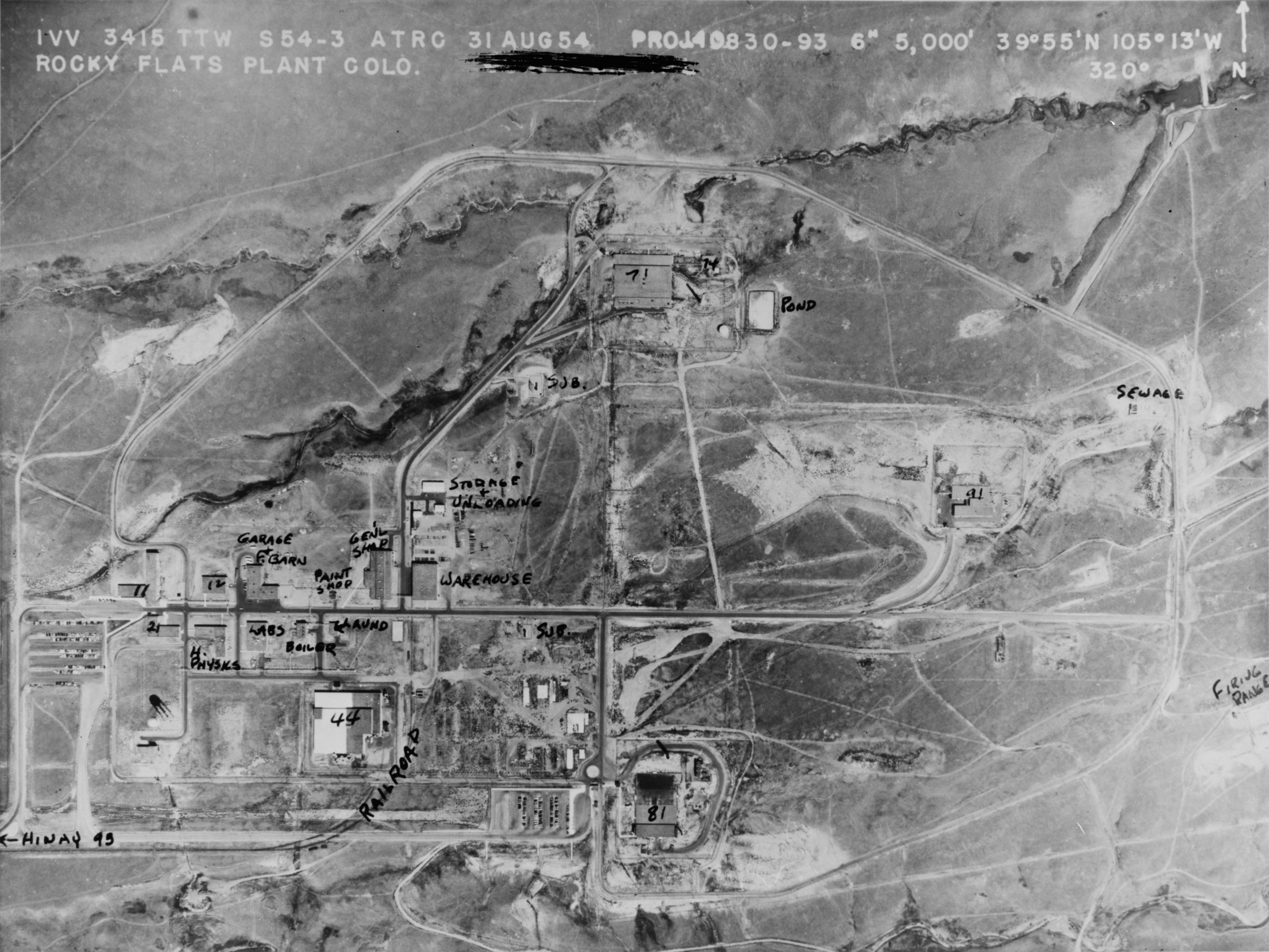
Rocky Flats Plant – 1954 aerial view

The employees at Rocky Flats Plant near Denver Colorado made plutonium warhead triggers (known as pits) for the United States nuclear weapons arsenal. The area surrounding the plant is contaminated with radioactive plutonium. According to Marco Kaltofen, and engineer and president of the Boston Chemical Data Corporation, "The material is still there, it's still on the surface." According to the EPA and the Colorado health department, former plant workers, as well as current construction workers might have greater exposure through inhaling radioactive dust than the average construction worker. The 1982 documentary film, Dark Circle, discloses worker safety issues at the Rocky Flats Plant, and lack of workplace regulations. Hazards at Rocky Flats included perforated (damaged) gloves for handling radioactive materials, and incidents when workers directly inhaled irradiated air.

==== Savannah River Plant ====
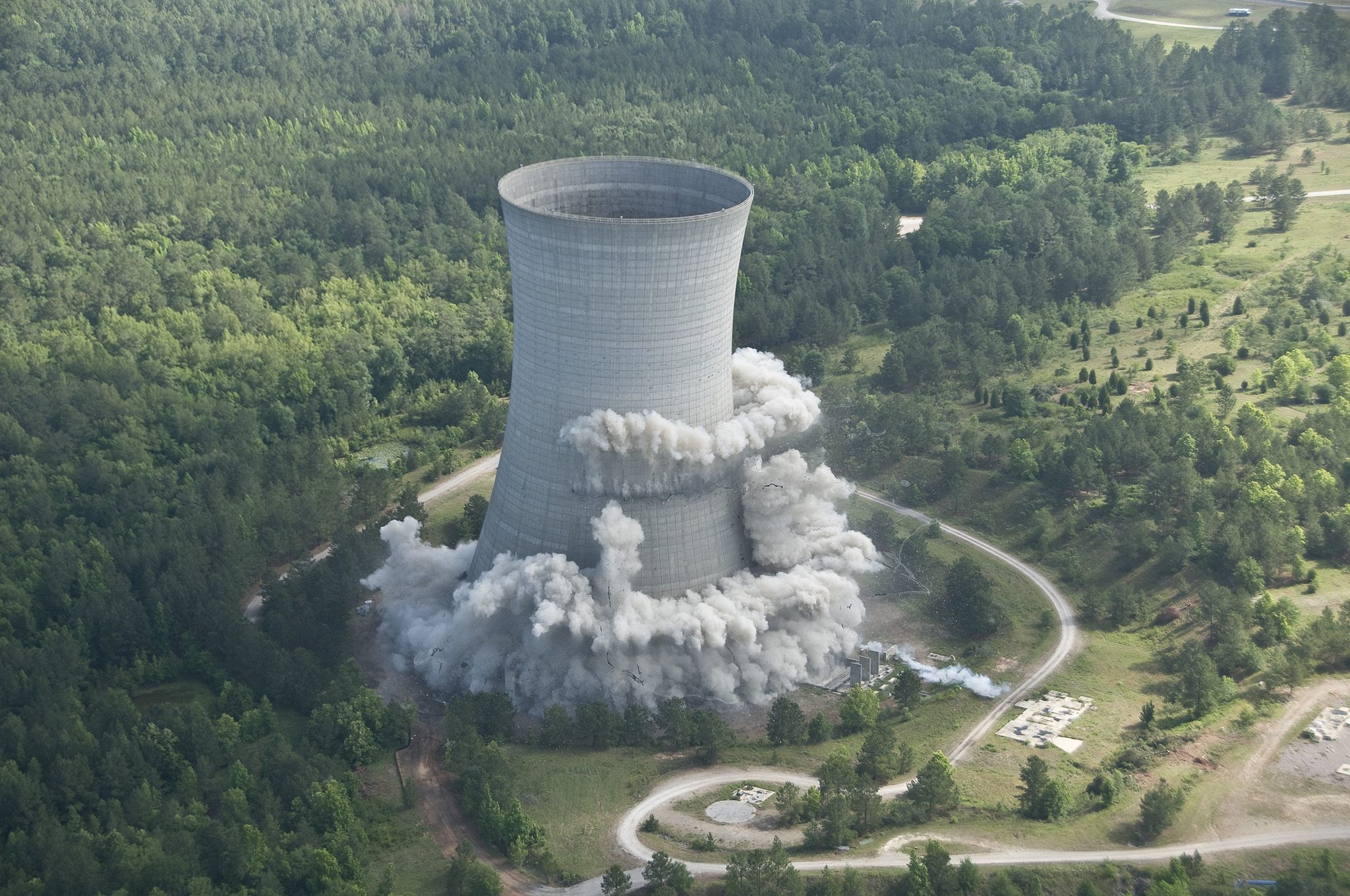
Savannah River Site demolition work

On October 3, 1975, plutonium-laced sludge breached the office wall of health inspector, Byron Vaigneur at the South Carolina-based Savannah River nuclear Weapons Site. He later developed breast cancer and chronic beryllium disease. According to a 2015 report by the Tribune News Service, Vaigneur is one of 107,394 Americans who have developed cancer and other environmental diseases from working in the nuclear weapons industry over the past 70 years. Nuclear stockpile related disease has cost American taxpayers $12 billion in medical expense payouts to workers.

=== Commercial nuclear workers ===
Incidents of worker exposure to radioactive materials in the commercial nuclear energy industry is well documented. A recent report by PBS investigative reporter and a year-long investigation by McClatchy News showed that there are more than 33,000 male and female nuclear workers who have died from nuclear work related illnesses, and more than 100,000 people in the U.S. diagnosed with cancer and other radiologically induced diseases.

==== Short-term workers ====
Thousands of contracted nuclear power plant "jumpers", "nuclear janitors" or "Glow Boys" employed by Atlantic Nuclear Services, Inc. (ANC) and other agencies are recruited to quickly resolve breakdowns, plug leaks, and clean up spills before reaching the allowed dose of radiation exposure. Officially known as nozzle dam technicians, enter containment structures to work on the steam generators. They work swiftly as within five minutes a jumper can be exposed to 1 rem of radiation (equivalent to 50 chest X-rays). A 1982 report states that the NRC limits contract worker exposures to 5 rems per year, however a 1984 report states that the NRC allows jumpers to be exposed to 5 to 12 rems per year. In addition to the danger of external contamination, jumpers can be exposed to internal contamination from breathing or ingesting airborne radioactive particles. The archive of event notification reports from the Nuclear Regulatory Commission, dated from 1999 - 2014, is located at NRC: Event Notification Reports Event reports from the International Atomic Energy Agency is located at: NEWS

==== Divers ====
Nuclear divers are laborers that work fully submerged in radiated water at nuclear reactors. There are three types of diver tasks: radioactive dives, non-radioactive dives, both of which occur inside reactors, and "mud-work" that involves cleaning out cooling-water intake systems in lakes, rivers and oceans. In 1986, two divers were killed while cleaning intake pipes at the Crystal River Plant in Florida. In 2006, diver Michael Pickart performed a dive inside an Arkansas nuclear reactor, and was exposed to 450 millirems of radiation.

==== Radium workers ====
Radium workers in the early 20th century, known as Radium Girls or Luminizers, incurred exposure doses that caused skeletal diseases including bone cancer. Radium was used as an alleged medical "cure" for a variety of ailments, as well as to create luminous clock and instrument dials. Radium-dial painters, mostly young women at production facilities in New Jersey, Pennsylvania, Illinois and other sites, succumbed to occupational injury and disease. Between the years of 1915 and 1959, there were 1,747 females and 161 males employed as "measured dial" Luminizers, and 1,910 unmeasured female workers, and 315 unmeasured male workers. The most common health issue was "radium jaw" (bone necrosis), anemia, epidermoid carcinomas, and sarcomas. The National Academy of Sciences Biological Effects of Ionizing Radiation, BEIR VII Phase 2 report, shows that women and children are more susceptible to increased cancer mortality than men. (Page 311 of the report shows this data in a graph.)

==== Shipyard workers ====
The 1991 Final Report of the Nuclear Shipyard Worker Study (NSWS) analyzed the effects of radiation exposure in the U.S. to three cohort groups: 27,872 high-dose nuclear workers, 10348 low-dose nuclear workers, and a control group of 32,510 shipyard workers not exposed to radiation. Dose reconstruction for occupational radiation exposure used by the U.S. Department of Labor assumes that the probability of cancer is "at least as likely as not" rendering it complex for workers to claim compensation via The Act.

==== Kerr-McGee Cimarron Fuel Fabrication Site ====
The most famous of U.S. case of on an incident involving a nuclear worker is that of Karen Silkwood, an employee of the Kerr-McGee Cimarron Fuel Fabrication Site in Crescent, Oklahoma. Silkwood was a technician, whose job was to make plutonium fuel pellets for assembly into nuclear reactor fuel rods. She was also a labor union activist negotiating for higher health and safety standards. In 1974, the Oil, Chemical and Atomic Workers Union stated that the Kerr-McGee plant had not only manufactured defective fuel rods, but that it had falsified records, and put employees' safety at risk. During the time that she was involved in these labor disputes, on November 5, 1974, she found that she had been contaminated with plutonium over 400 times the legal limit. On November 7, it was found that her internal lung contamination was dangerously high during breath tests, and urine samples. On November 13, 1974, Silkwood was driving to a union meeting with documents regarding her case. She died on the way to the meeting from a severe hit-and-run automobile crash that damaged both the rear end and front end of her vehicle. There is much speculation that her car was forced off the road by another vehicle. Her body was examined by Los Alamos Laboratory Tissue Analysis Program as requested by the Atomic Energy Commission and the State Medical Examiner. It was found that there were significant amounts of plutonium in her lungs, and even higher amounts in her gastrointestinal organs. In 2014, her Lawyer, Gerry Spence gave a two part interview, on the implications of her case in relation to compensation for radiation injury, and on proving strict liability and physical injury in nuclear facilities.

==== Three-mile Island (1979) ====
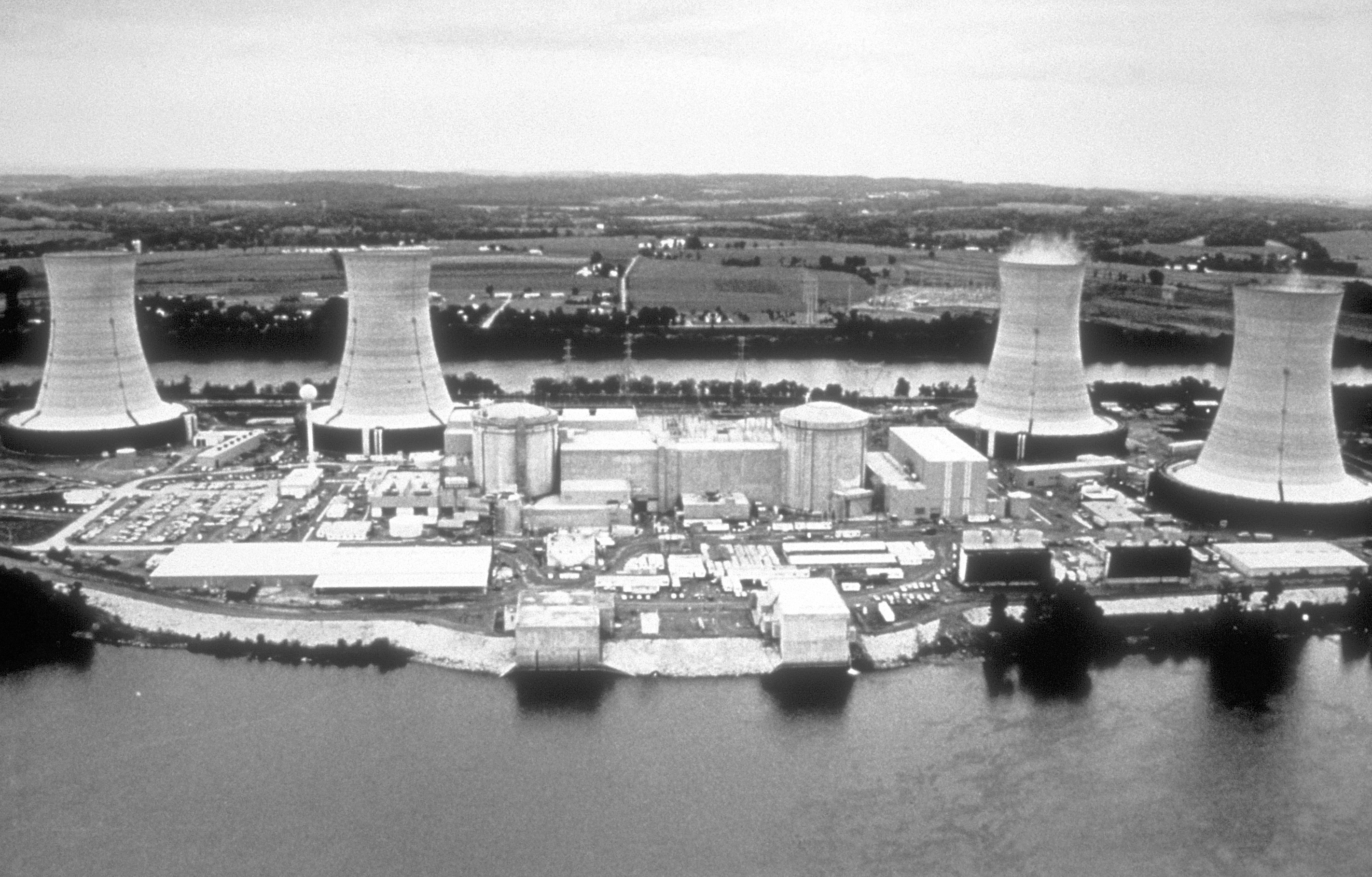
Three Mile Island nuclear power plant

The Three Mile Island accident in Pennsylvania occurred on March 28, 1979, was rated a 5 on the 7-point International Nuclear Event Scale resulting in the meltdown of radioactive fuel in the Unit 2 reactor.

==== Sequoyah Fuels Corporation ====
On January 4, 1986, a tank containing uranium hexafluoride (UF6) ruptured, releasing 14.5 tons of gaseous UF6 into the environment and causing the death of James Harrison, a 25-year old African American/Cherokee worker, and the hospitalization of 37 workers at the plant. Approximately 100 downwinders were affected by the leak, and treated for inhalation of the toxic gas. The tank was overloaded with 2000 pounds beyond its capacity.

==== West Valley Nuclear Site ====
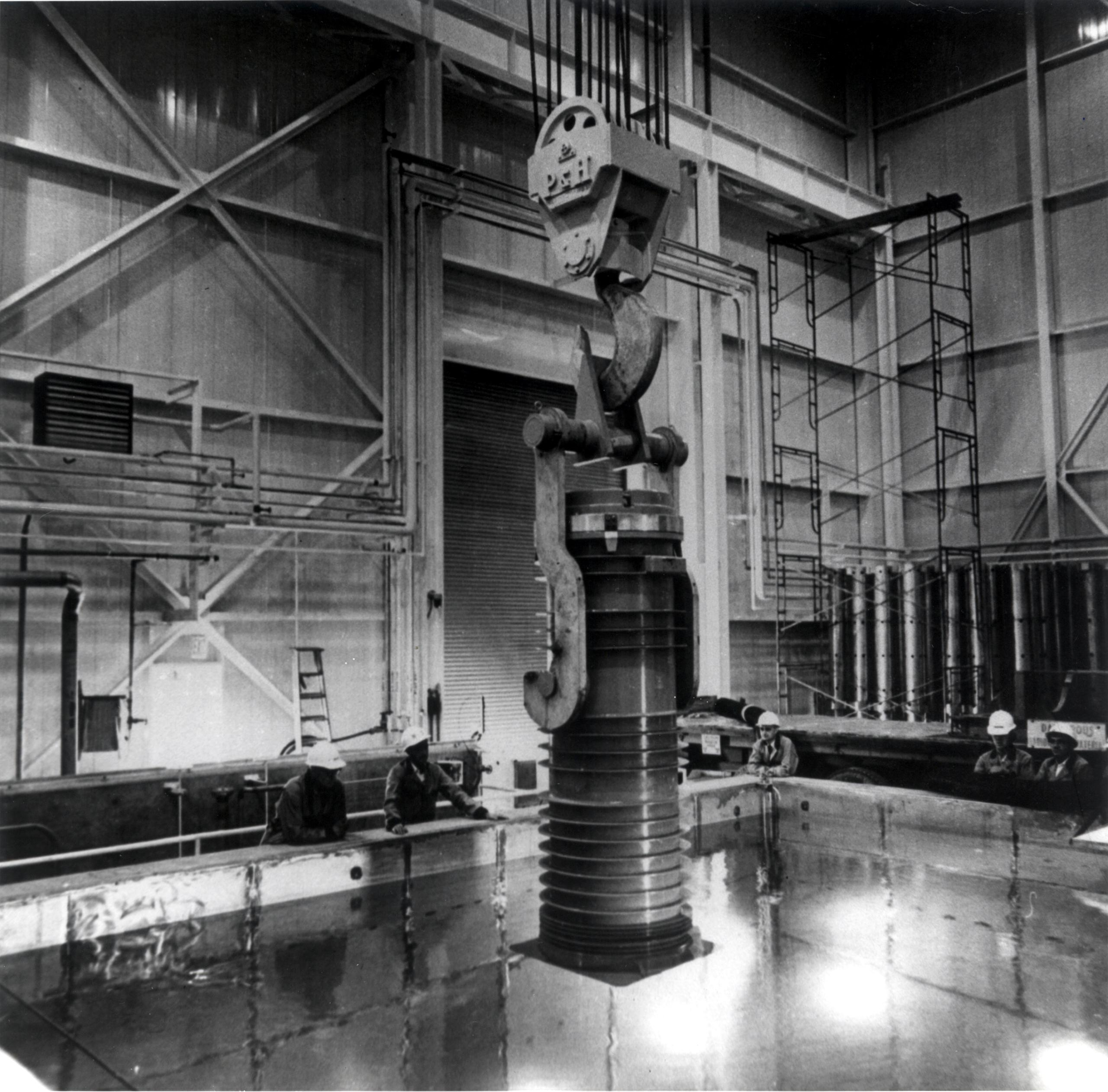
First fuel element placement at the West Valley site

Located in Western upstate New York, the West Valley nuclear site operated as a commercial nuclear material reprocessing site from 1966 to 1972. In those years the plant processes high and low-level waste, and had a high incident rate of workers exposed to radiation; Science journal reported "almost without precedent in a major nuclear facility." In 1980 the U.S. Congress approved an Act (P.L. 96-368) that required the U.S. Department of Energy (DOE) and other agencies to clean up contaminated water and land resources, at the cost of $5.2 billion. In 2006, New York State filed a lawsuit against the DOE to commit to a long-term clean up and stewardship plan, assigning Federal accountability, and reimbursement of costs to New York state.

== Waste storage ==
=== Waste Isolation Pilot Plant (WIPP) ===
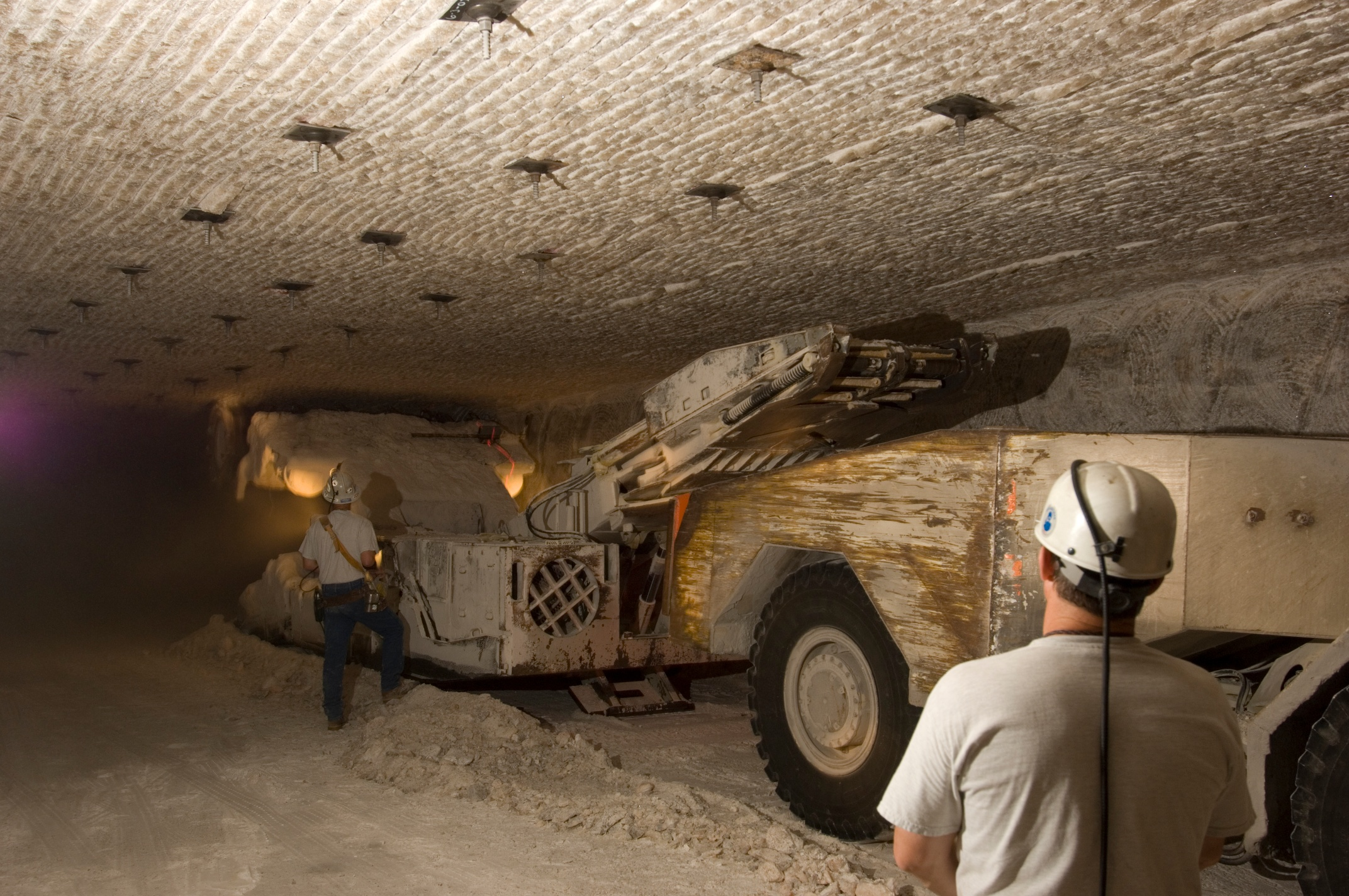
DOE begins mining operations for salt disposal investigations at WIPP 2

The Waste Isolation Pilot Plant, was designed as a pilot, test study site for deep geologic storage of radioactive waste. It is managed by the U.S. Department of Energy (DOE) and currently serves as the nation's only deep geological repository for transuranic (TRU) nuclear waste generated by the military and defense industry. It is located in Southern New Mexico near the border of Texas and Mexico. It has been disposing of waste 2,150 feet underground in the ancient Permian Sea salt formation since 1999, accepting waste from 22 national atomic legacy sites. Designed to last tens of thousands of years, the WIPP site had its first leak of airborne radioactive materials on February 1, 2014. 140 employees working underground at the time were sheltered indoors. 13 of these tested positive for internal radioactive contamination. Internal exposure to radioactive isotopes is more serious than external exposure, as these particles lodge in the body for decades, irradiating the surrounding tissues, thus increasing the risk of future cancers and other health effects. A second leak at the plant occurred shortly after the first, releasing plutonium and other radiotoxins, causing concern for communities living near the repository. Since opening in 1999, the WIPP "pilot site" has received over 11,000 shipments of TRU waste (transuranic waste). During the February 14, 2014 leak, 22 workers were exposed to radioactive materials. Don Hancock, Director of the Nuclear Waste Safety Program for the SouthWest Research and information Center describes the theory of how nitrate salts in the "kitty litter" absorbent interacted with plutonium causing the breach of one or more 55-gallon drums stored at WIPP through a chemical reaction that caused an inflagration. Fundamental questions remain regarding the Department of Energy's clean up standards for WIPP, as there is not a "clean-up" standard or regulation for the underground site, by either the DOE oversight or the company contracted to oversee the site, Nuclear Waste Partnership. Over the past 15 years, 91,000 cubic meters of radioactive waste, and more than 171,000 containers of radioactive waste have been placed at WIPP - more than any other site in the country.

== See also ==
- Hazardous materials
- Energy Employees Occupational Illness Compensation Program
- Downwinders
- Nuclear weapons testing
- Nevada Test Site
- Uranium mining and the Navajo people
- Nuclear weapons and the United States
- Pacific Proving Grounds
- Radium and radon in the environment
- Uranium mining in the United States
- Uranium mining debate
- Radiation Exposure Compensation Act
- Anti-nuclear movement in the United States
- International Commission on Radiological Protection
- International Radiation Protection Association
- Radiation monitoring
- Environmental Justice
- Environmental racism
- Energy law
